= Lisp Machine Lisp =

Programming language, dialect of Lisp

- Family: Lisp
- Designed by: David A. Moon, Richard Stallman, Daniel Weinreb
- Developers: MIT, Symbolics, Lisp Machines, Texas Instruments
- First appeared: 1976; 50 years ago
- Implementation language: Lisp
- Platform: Lisp machines
- OS: Genera, others
- Filename extensions: .lisp, .qfasl

Dialects
- Lisp Machine Lisp, ZetaLisp

Influenced by
- Lisp, Maclisp, Interlisp

Influenced
- Common Lisp

Lisp Machine Lisp is a programming language, a dialect of the language Lisp. A direct descendant of Maclisp, it was initially developed in the mid to late 1970s as the system programming language for the Massachusetts Institute of Technology (MIT) Lisp machines. Lisp Machine Lisp was also the Lisp dialect with the most influence on the design of Common Lisp.

Lisp Machine Lisp branched into three dialects. Symbolics named their variant ZetaLisp. Lisp Machines, Inc. and later Texas Instruments (with the TI Explorer) would share a common code base, but their dialect of Lisp Machine Lisp would differ from the version maintained at the MIT AI Lab by Richard Stallman and others.

== Manual ==
The Lisp Machine Manual describes the Lisp Machine Lisp language in detail. The manual was popularly termed the Chine Nual, because the full title was printed across the front and back covers such that only those letters appeared on the front. This name is sometimes further abbreviated by blending the two words into Chinual.

== Traits ==
Lisp Machine Lisp features include:

- Support for object-oriented programming via an object system named Flavors
- Uses dynamic binding, but supports closures with a special construct
- Integer numbers were read and printed in octal (base 8) by default
- Dividing floating point numbers returned decimals, dividing integers returned rational numbers (fractions)
