= Lisp Machines =

Computer company (1979–1987)

Lisp Machines, Inc.
- Industry: Computers
- Founded: 1979; 47 years ago in Cambridge, Massachusetts, United States
- Founder: Richard Greenblatt
- Defunct: 1987
- Fate: Bankruptcy

Lisp Machines, Inc. was a company formed in 1979 by Richard Greenblatt of MIT's Artificial Intelligence Laboratory to build Lisp machines. It was based in Cambridge, Massachusetts.

By 1979, the Lisp Machine Project at MIT, originated and headed by Greenblatt, had constructed over 30 CADR computers for various projects at MIT. Russell Noftsker, who had formerly been administrator of the MIT Artificial Intelligence lab some years previously and who had since started and run a small company, was convinced that computers based on the artificial intelligence language LISP had a bright future commercially. There were a number of ready customers who were anxious to get machines similar to ones they had seen at MIT.

Greenblatt and Noftsker had differing ideas about the structure and financing of the proposed company. Greenblatt believed the company could be "bootstrapped", i.e. financed practically from scratch from the order flow from customers (some of whom were willing to pay in advance). This would mean that the principals of the company would retain control. Noftsker favored a more conventional venture capital model, raising a considerable sum of money, but with the investors having control of the company. The two negotiated at length, but neither would compromise. The ensuing discussions of the choice rent the lab into two factions. In February, 1979, matters came to a head. Greenblatt believed that the proceeds from the construction and sale of a few machines could be profitably reinvested in the funding of the company. Most sided with Noftsker, believing that a commercial venture fund-backed company had a better chance of surviving and commercializing Lisp Machines than Greenblatt's proposed self-sustaining start-up. They went on to start Symbolics Inc.

Alexander Jacobson, a consultant from CDC, was trying to put together an AI natural language computer application, came to Greenblatt, seeking a Lisp machine for his group to work with. Eight months after Greenblatt had his disastrous conference with Noftsker, he had yet to produce anything. Alexander Jacobson decided that the only way Greenblatt was going to actually start his company and build the Lisp machines that Jacobson needed, was if he pushed and financially helped Greenblatt launch his company. Jacobson pulled together business plans, a board, and a partner, F. Stephen Wyle, for Greenblatt. The newfound company was named LISP Machine, Inc. (LMI), and was funded mostly by order flow including CDC orders, via Jacobson.

== History of LMI ==
The following parable-like story is told about LMI by Steven Levy and used for the first time in Hackers: Heroes of the Computer Revolution (1984). Levy's account of hackers is in large part based on the values of the hackers at MIT Artificial Intelligence Laboratory. Among these hackers was Richard Stallman, whom Levy at the time called the last true hacker.

The people at the lab came together, and together created a true hacker's machine, the original Lisp Machines. When Russell Noftsker suggested that they move on, and spread the gospel beyond the walls of the lab, the hackers at the lab differed wildly in how they wanted the company run. Greenblatt insisted that the company remain true to the hacker spirit, in that it should bow to no one, and focus solely on the creation of a good product. Some other hackers felt that this was not the way to lead a company. If this was done, it would never grow and truly spread the word of the hacker ethic. Furthermore, Greenblatt demanded control over the company, to ensure that his vision was carried forth. Others (including Bill Gosper and Tom Knight) felt that to be under the rule of Greenblatt was unacceptable.

When Noftsker started Symbolics, while he was able to pay salaries, he didn't actually have a building or any equipment for the programmers to work on. He bargained with Patrick Winston that, in exchange for allowing Symbolics' staff to keep working out of MIT, Symbolics would let MIT use internally and freely all the software Symbolics developed. Unfortunately this openness would later lead to accusations of intellectual property theft.

In the early 1980s, to prevent software from being used on their competitors' computers, manufacturers stopped distributing source code and began using copyright and restrictive software licenses to limit or prohibit copying and redistribution. Such proprietary software had existed before, but this shift in the legal characteristics of software was triggered by the U.S. Copyright Act of 1976; see software copyright.

While both companies delivered proprietary software, Richard Stallman believed that LMI, unlike Symbolics, had tried to avoid hurting the lab. Stallman had proclaimed that "the prospect of charging money for software was a crime against humanity." He clarified, years later, that it is blocking the user's freedom that he believes is a "crime", not the act of charging for a copy of the software. Symbolics had recruited most of the remaining MIT hackers including notable hacker Bill Gosper, who then left the AI Lab. Symbolics forced Greenblatt to also resign at the AI lab, by citing MIT policies. So for two years at the MIT AI Lab, from 1982 to the end of 1983, Stallman attempted to duplicate the efforts of the Symbolics programmers, in order to prevent them from gaining a monopoly on the lab's computers.

== Struggle and decline ==
Lisp Machines, Inc. sold its first LISP machines, designed at MIT, as the LMI-CADR. After a series of internal battles, Symbolics began selling the CADR from the MIT Lab as the LM-2. Symbolics had been hindered by Noftsker's promise to give Greenblatt a year's head start, and by severe delays in procuring venture capital. Symbolics still had the major advantage that while none of the AI Lab hackers had gone to work for Greenblatt, a solid 14 had signed onto Symbolics. There were two AI Lab people who choose not to be employed by either: Richard Stallman and Marvin Minsky.

Symbolics ended up producing around 100 LM-2s, each of which sold for $70,000. Both companies developed second-generation products based on the CADR: the Symbolics 3600 and the LMI-LAMBDA (of which LMI managed to sell around 200). The 3600, which shipped a year late, expanded on the CADR by widening the machine word to 36-bits, expanding the address space to 28-bits, and adding hardware to accelerate certain common functions that were implemented in microcode on the CADR. The LMI-LAMBDA, which came out a year after the 3600, in 1983, was mostly upward compatible with the CADR (source CADR microcode fragments could be reassembled), but there were improvements in instruction fetch and other hardware differences including use of a multiplier chip and a faster logic family and cache memory. The LAMBDA's processor cards were designed to work in a NuBus-based engineering workstation, the NuMachine, which had been originated by Steve Ward's group at MIT, and, through a separate chain of events, was being developed by Western Digital Corporation. This allowed the popular LAMBDA "2x2" configuration whereby two machines shared one infrastructure, with considerable savings. Texas Instruments (TI) joined the fray by investing in LMI after it ran out of money, purchasing and relocating the NuBus engineering workstation unit from Western Digital, licensing the LMI-LAMBDA design and later producing its own variant, the TI Explorer.

Symbolics continued to develop the 3600 family and its operating system, Genera, and produced the Ivory, a VLSI chip implementation of the Symbolics architecture. Texas Instruments shrunk the Explorer into silicon as the Explorer II and later the MicroExplorer. LMI abandoned the CADR architecture and developed its own K-Machine, but LMI went bankrupt in 1987 before the machine could be brought to market.

== GigaMos Systems ==
LMI was reincarnated as GigaMos Systems; Greenblatt was one of its officers. GigaMos, through the ownership of a Canadian backer named Guy Montpetit, bought the assets of LMI through a Chapter 11 bankruptcy reorganization. Prior to the incorporation of GigaMos, LMI developed a new Lisp machine called the "K-machine" which used a RISC-like architecture. Montpetit subsequently became embroiled in a 1989 Canadian political scandal which, as a side-effect, resulted in the seizure of all the assets of GigaMos, rendering the company unable to meet payroll.

== Inspiration for Stallman and Free Software ==
According to Richard Stallman, the dispute between LMI and Symbolics inspired Stallman to start software development for the GNU operating system in January 1984, and the Free Software Foundation (FSF) in October 1985. These were forerunners of the open-source-software movement and the Linux operating system.
