= TRIX (operating system) =

- Developer: MIT's Laboratory for Computer Science (LCS)
- OS family: Unix-like
- Working state: Historic
- Source model: Open source
- Initial release: 1986; 40 years ago
- Available in: English
- Supported platforms: NuMachine
- Kernel type: Monolithic kernel
- Default user interface: Command-line interface

TRIX is a network-oriented research operating system developed in the late 1970s at MIT's Laboratory for Computer Science (LCS) by Professor Steve Ward and his research group. It ran on the NuMachine and had remote procedure call functionality built into its kernel, but was otherwise a Version 7 Unix workalike.

== Design and implementation ==
On startup, the NuMachine would load the same program on each CPU in the system, passing each instance the numeric ID of the CPU it was running on. TRIX relied on this design to have the first CPU set up global data structures and then set a flag to signal that initialization was complete. After that, each instance of the kernel was able to access global data. The system also supported data private to each CPU. Access to the filesystem was provided by a program in user space.

The kernel supported unnamed threads running in domains. A domain was the equivalent of a Unix process without a stack pointer (each thread in a domain had a stack pointer). A thread could change domains, and the system scheduler would migrate threads between CPUs in order to keep all processors busy. Threads had access to a single kind of mutual exclusion primitive, and one of seven priorities. The scheduler was designed to avoid priority inversion. User space programs could create threads through a spawn system call.

A garbage collector would periodically identify and free unused domains.

The shared memory model used to coordinate work between the various CPUs caused memory bus contention and was known to be a source of inefficiency. The designers were aware of designs that would have alleviated the contention. Indeed, TRIX's original design used a nonblocking message passing mechanism, but "this implementation was found to have deficiencies often overlooked in the literature," including poor performance.

Although the TRIX operating system was first implemented on the NuMachine, this was due to the availability of the NuMachine at MIT, not because of any characteristic of the architecture. The system was designed to be easily portable. It was implemented largely in C with little assembly code. The mutual exclusion primitive could be ported to any architecture with an atomic test and set instruction.

== Attempted use by the GNU Project ==
Richard Stallman mentions in the 1985 GNU Manifesto that "an initial kernel exists" for the GNU operating system, "but many more features are needed to emulate Unix." This was a reference to TRIX's kernel, which TRIX's authors had decided to distribute as free software.

In a speech in October 1986, Stallman elaborated that "the TRIX kernel runs, and it has a certain limited amount of Unix compatibility, but it needs a lot more. Currently it has a file system that uses the same structure on disk as the ancient Unix file system does. This made it easier to debug the thing, because they could set up the files with Unix, and then they could run TRIX, but that file system doesn't have any of the features that I believe are necessary." The features Stallman wished to add (file versioning, undeletion, information on when and how and where the file was backed up on tape, atomic file updates) were not generally associated with Unix.

In December 1986, developers used TRIX's kernel as a base in their first attempt to create a kernel for GNU. They eventually decided Trix was unusable as a starting point, primarily because:

- it only ran on "an obscure, expensive 68000 box", and would therefore require porting to other architectures, and
- it was decided that the Mach microkernel was a better underlying design for a server-based operating system. This second attempt evolved into the GNU Hurd.

== See also ==
- GNU Mach
- Comparison of operating system kernels
