= NuMachine =

1970s computer workstation

The NuMachine, or Nu Machine, is an early microprocessor-based computer workstation designed to interface with local area networks. It was developed in the late 1970s at MIT's Laboratory for Computer Science (LCS) by Professor Steve Ward and his research group in concert with Western Digital. The NuMachine is 68010-based running at 10 MHz. The project included the development of TRIX, a Unix operating system variant.

The NuMachine was first developed commercially by Western Digital, but they decided not to enter the workstation business. It was bought by Texas Instruments in 1983. Texas Instruments dropped the NuMachine development in 1985 in favor of the TI Explorer.

Its main legacy is a bus architecture called NuBus that was later adopted by Apple Computer for its Macintosh II and by NeXT, and influenced the design of the PCI bus. The TRIX operating system was used by the GNU Project for its first attempt at an operating system kernel.
