= NuBus =

32-bit parallel computer bus

- Year created: 1987; 39 years ago
- Created by: MIT
- Width in bits: 32
- Style: Parallel

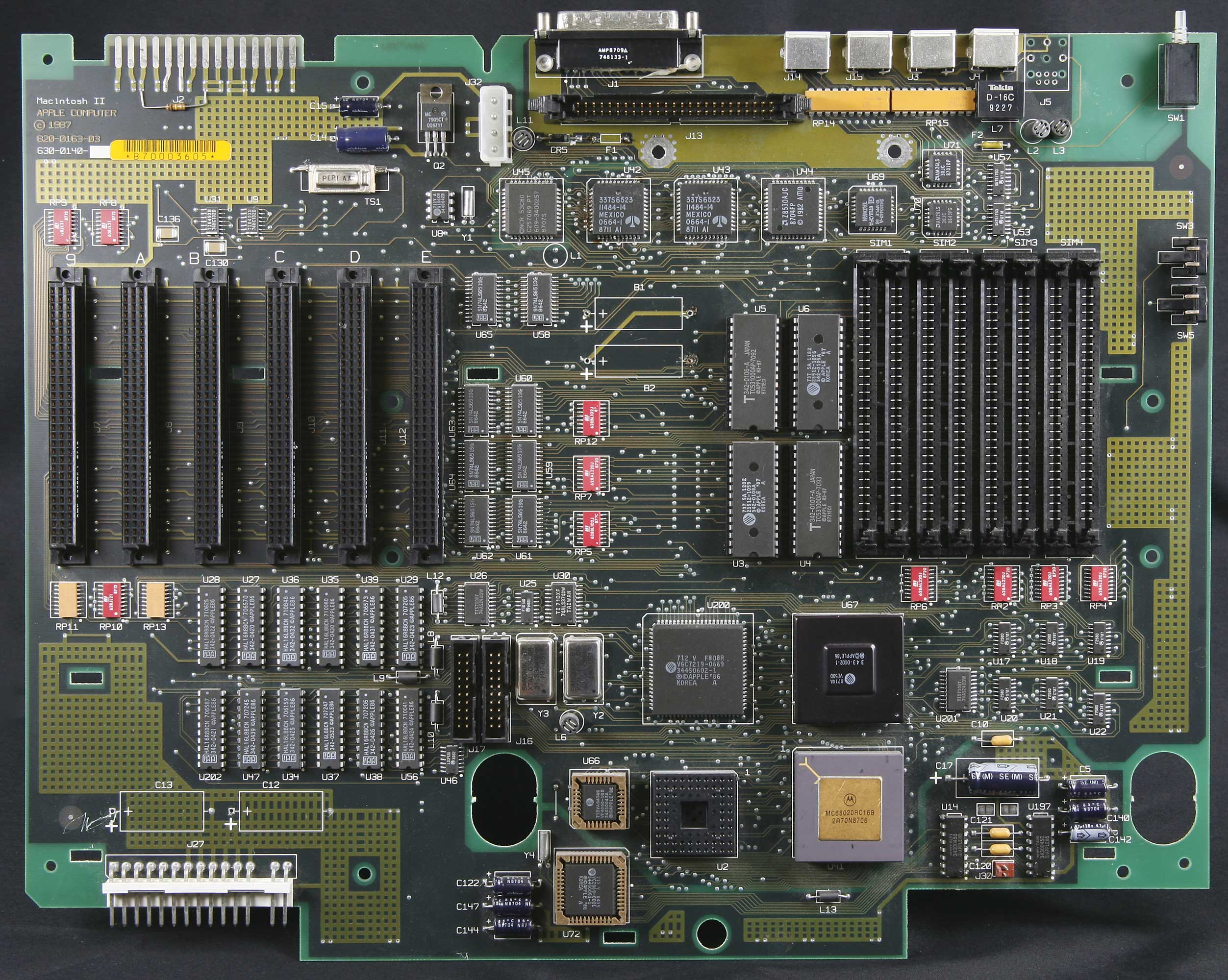
The Macintosh II motherboard, with its six NuBus slots visible on the left

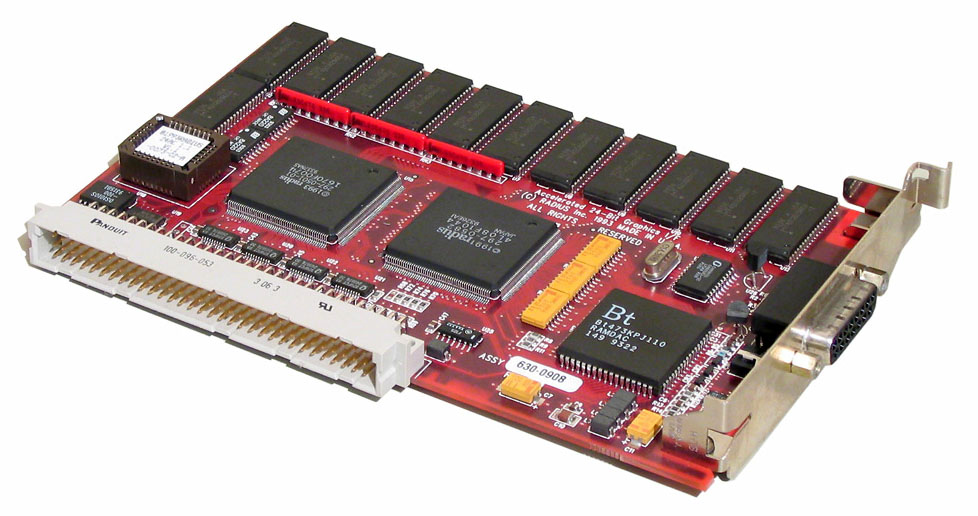
Example of a NuBus graphics card, a Radius PrecisionColor Pro 8/24xj. This is a "half-length" card, with a maximum length of 7 inches (18 cm). The maximum length for full-size NuBus cards is 12 inches (30 cm).

NuBus (/ˈn(j)uˌbʌs/) is a 32-bit parallel computer bus, originally developed at MIT between 1978 and 1979 as part of the NuMachine workstation project, and standardized by the IEEE in 1987. The first complete implementation of the NuBus was done by Western Digital for their NuMachine, and for the Lisp Machines Inc. LMI Lambda. NuBus was later incorporated in Lisp products by Texas Instruments (Explorer), and used as the main expansion bus by Apple Computer. A variant called NeXTBus was developed by NeXT for their workstation systems. It is no longer widely used outside the embedded market.

== Architecture ==
Early microcomputer buses like S-100 were often just connections to the pins of the microprocessor and to the power rails. This meant that a change in the computer's architecture generally led to a new bus as well. Looking to avoid such problems in the future, NuBus was designed to be independent of the processor, its general architecture and any details of its I/O handling.

Among its many advanced features for the era, NuBus used a 32-bit backplane when 8- or 16-bit busses were common. This was seen as making the bus "future-proof", as it was generally believed that 32-bit systems would arrive in the near future while 64-bit buses and beyond would remain impractical and excessive.

In addition, NuBus was agnostic about the processor itself. Most buses up to this point conformed to the signalling and data standards of the machine they were plugged into (being big or little endian for instance). NuBus made no such assumptions, which meant that any NuBus card could be plugged into any NuBus machine, as long as there was an appropriate device driver.

In order to select the proper device driver, NuBus included an ID scheme that allowed the cards to identify themselves to the host computer during startup. This meant that the user didn't have to configure the system, the bane of bus systems up to that point. For instance, with ISA the driver had to be configured not only for the card, but for any memory it required, the interrupts it used, and so on. NuBus required no such configuration, making it one of the first examples of plug-and-play architecture.

On the downside, while this flexibility made NuBus much simpler for the user and device driver authors, it made things more difficult for the designers of the cards themselves. Whereas most "simple" bus systems were easily supported with a handful of input/output chips designed to be used with that CPU in mind, with NuBus every card and computer had to convert everything to a platform-agnostic "NuBus world". Typically this meant adding a NuBus controller chip between the bus and any I/O chips on the card, increasing costs. While this is a trivial exercise today, one that all newer buses require, in the 1980s NuBus was considered needlessly complex and expensive.

== Implementations ==
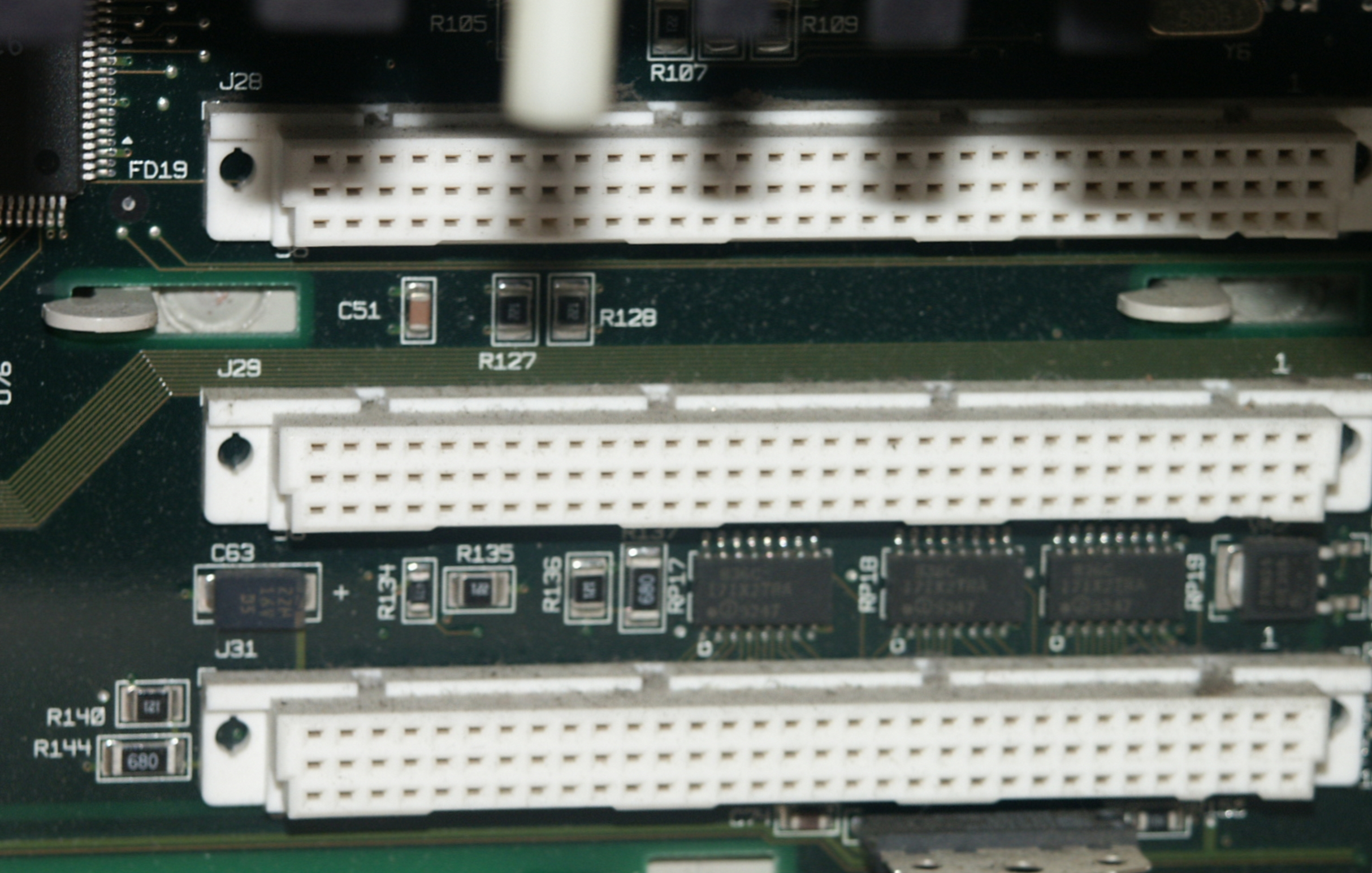
Close-up of the NuBus 90 connectors in a Macintosh Quadra 950

The NuBus became an IEEE standard in 1987 as IEEE 1196. This version used a standard DIN 41612 96-pin three-row connector, running the system on a 10 MHz clock for a maximum burst throughput of 40 MB/s and average speeds of 10 to 20 MB/s. A later addition, NuBus 90, increased the clock rate to 20 MHz for better throughput, burst increasing to about 70 MB/s, and average to about 30 MB/s.

The NuBus was first developed commercially in the Western Digital NuMachine, and first used in a production product by their licensee, Lisp Machines, Inc., in the LMI-Lambda, a Lisp Machine. The project and the development group was sold by Western Digital to Texas Instruments in 1984. The technology was incorporated into their TI Explorer, also a Lisp Machine. In 1986, Texas Instruments used the NuBus in the S1500 multiprocessor UNIX system. Later, both Texas Instruments and Symbolics developed Lisp Machine NuBus boards (the TI MicroExplorer and the Symbolics MacIvory) based on their Lisp supporting microprocessors. These NuBus boards were co-processor Lisp Machines for the Apple Macintosh line (the Mac II and Mac Quadras).

NuBus was also selected by Apple Computer for use in their Macintosh II project, where its plug-n-play nature fit well with the Mac philosophy of ease-of-use. It was used in most of the Macintosh II series that made up the professional-level Mac lineup from the late 1980s. It was upgraded to NuBus 90 starting with the Macintosh Quadras and used into the mid-1990s. Early Quadras only supported the 20 MHz rate when two cards were talking to each other, since the motherboard controller was not upgraded. This was later addressed in the NuBus implementation on the 660AV and 840AV models. This improved NuBus controller was used in the first generation Power Macintosh 6100, 7100 and 8100 models. Later Power Mac models adopted Intel's PCI bus. Apple's NuBus implementation used pin and socket connectors on the back of the card rather than edge connectors with Phillips screws inside the case that most cards use, making it much easier to install cards. Apple's computers also supplied an always-on +5 V "trickle" power supply for tasks such as watching the phone line while the computer was turned off. This was apparently part of an unapproved NuBus standard.

NuBus was also selected by NeXT Computer for their line of machines, but used a different physical PCB layout. NuBus appears to have seen little use outside these roles, and when Apple switched to PCI in the mid-1990s, NuBus quickly disappeared.

== See also ==
- List of device bandwidths
