= Richard Stallman =

American activist and programmer (born 1953)

- Stallman in 2024
- Born: Richard Matthew Stallman; March 16, 1953 (age 73); New York City, New York, U.S.
- Other name: rms (RMS)
- Education: Harvard University
- Occupations: Activist; programmer
- Known for: Free software movement; GNU; GNU Emacs; GNU Compiler Collection; GNU General Public License; copyleft; Free Software Foundation
- Awards: MacArthur Fellowship; ACM Grace Murray Hopper Award; EFF Pioneer Award; ACM Software System Award; Internet Hall of Fame
- Website: stallman.org

Signature
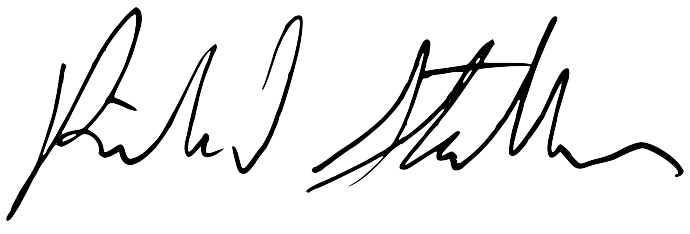

Richard Matthew Stallman (/ˈstɔːlmən/ STAWL-mən; born March 16, 1953), also known by his initials rms, is an American free software activist and programmer. He campaigns for software to be distributed in such a manner that its users have the freedom to use, study, distribute, and modify that software. Software which ensures these freedoms is termed free software. Stallman launched the GNU Project, founded the Free Software Foundation (FSF) in October 1985, developed the GNU C Compiler and GNU Emacs, and wrote all versions of the GNU General Public License.

Stallman launched the GNU Project in September 1983 to write a Unix-like computer operating system composed entirely of free software. With that he also launched the free software movement. He has been GNU Project's lead architect and organizer, and developed a number of pieces of widely used GNU software including among others, the GNU Compiler Collection, GNU Debugger, and GNU Emacs.

Stallman pioneered the concept of copyleft, which uses the principles of copyright law to preserve the right to use, modify, and distribute free software. He is the main author of free software licenses which describe those terms, most notably the GNU General Public License (GPL), the most widely used free software license.

In 1989, he co-founded the League for Programming Freedom. Since the mid-1990s, Stallman has spent most of his time advocating for free software, as well as campaigning against software patents, digital rights management (which he refers to as digital restrictions management), software license agreements, non-disclosure agreements, activation keys, software protection dongles, copy restriction, proprietary formats, and closed-source binary executables.

In September 2019, Stallman resigned as president of the FSF and left his visiting scientist role at MIT after making controversial comments about the Jeffrey Epstein sex trafficking scandal related to Marvin Minsky. He remained head of the GNU Project, and in 2021 returned to the FSF board of directors and others.

== Early life ==
Stallman was born March 16, 1953 in New York City, to a family of Jewish heritage. He had a troublesome relationship with his parents and did not feel he had a proper home. He was interested in computers at a young age; when he was a pre-teen at a summer camp, he read manuals for the IBM 7094. From 1967 to 1969, Stallman attended a Columbia University Saturday program for high school students. He was also a volunteer laboratory assistant in the biology department at Rockefeller University. Although he was interested in mathematics and physics, his supervising professor at Rockefeller thought he showed promise as a biologist.

His first experience with actual computers was at the IBM New York Scientific Center when he was in high school. He was hired for the summer in 1970 after his senior year of high school, to write a numerical analysis program in Fortran. He completed the task after a couple of weeks ("I swore that I would never use FORTRAN again because I despised it as a language compared with other languages") and spent the rest of the summer writing a text editor in APL and a preprocessor for the PL/I programming language on the IBM System/360.

=== Harvard University and MIT ===
As a first-year student at Harvard University in fall 1970, Stallman was known for his strong performance in Math 55. He was happy, "For the first time in my life, I felt I had found a home at Harvard."

In 1971, near the end of his first year at Harvard, he became a programmer at the MIT Artificial Intelligence Laboratory, and became a regular in the hacker community, where he was usually known by his initials, RMS, which he used in his computer accounts. Stallman received a bachelor's degree in physics (magna cum laude) from Harvard in 1974. He considered staying on at Harvard, but instead decided to enroll as a graduate student at the Massachusetts Institute of Technology (MIT). He pursued a doctorate in physics for one year, but left the program to focus on his programming at the MIT AI Laboratory.

While working (starting in 1975) as a research assistant at MIT under Gerry Sussman, Stallman published a paper (with Sussman) in 1977 on an AI truth maintenance system, called dependency-directed backtracking. The paper was an early work on the problem of intelligent backtracking in constraint satisfaction problems. As of 2009, the technique Stallman and Sussman introduced was still the most general and powerful form of intelligent backtracking. The technique of constraint recording, wherein partial results of a search are recorded for later reuse, was also introduced in this paper.

As a hacker in MIT's AI laboratory, Stallman worked on software projects like TECO and Emacs for the Incompatible Timesharing System (ITS), as well as the Lisp machine operating system (the CONS of 1974–1976 and the CADR of 1977–1979—this latter unit was commercialized by Symbolics and Lisp Machines, Inc. (LMI) starting around 1980). He became an ardent critic of restricted computer access in the lab, which at that time was funded primarily by the Defense Advanced Research Projects Agency (DARPA). When MIT's Laboratory for Computer Science (LCS) installed a password control system in 1977, Stallman found a way to decrypt the passwords and sent users messages containing their decoded password, with a suggestion to change it to the empty string (that is, no password) instead, to re-enable anonymous access to the systems. Around 20 percent of the users followed his advice at the time, although passwords ultimately prevailed. Stallman boasted of the success of his campaign for many years afterward.

== Events leading to GNU ==
In the late 1970s and early 1980s, the hacker culture which Stallman thrived on began to fragment. To prevent software from being used on their competitors' computers, most manufacturers stopped distributing source code and began using copyright and restrictive software licenses to limit or prohibit copying and redistribution. Such proprietary software had existed before, and it became apparent that it would become the norm. This shift in the legal characteristics of software was a consequence triggered by the US Copyright Act of 1976.

When Brian Reid in 1979 placed time bombs in the Scribe markup language and word processing system to restrict unlicensed access to the software, Stallman proclaimed it "a crime against humanity". During an interview in 2008, he clarified that it is blocking the user's freedom that he believes is a crime, not the issue of charging for software. Stallman's texinfo is a GPL replacement, loosely based on Scribe; the original version was finished in 1986.

In 1980, Stallman and some other hackers at the AI Lab were refused access to the source code for the software of a newly installed laser printer, the Xerox 9700. Stallman had modified the software for the Lab's previous laser printer (the XGP, Xerographic Printer), so it electronically messaged a user when the person's job was printed, and would message all logged-in users waiting for print jobs if the printer was jammed. Not being able to add these features to the new printer was a major inconvenience, as the printer was on a different floor from most of the users. This experience convinced Stallman of people's need to be able to freely modify the software they use.

Richard Greenblatt, a fellow AI Lab hacker, founded Lisp Machines, Inc. (LMI) to market Lisp machines, which he and Tom Knight designed at the lab. Greenblatt rejected outside investment, believing that the proceeds from the construction and sale of a few machines could be profitably reinvested in the growth of the company. In contrast, the other hackers felt that the venture capital-funded approach was better. As no agreement could be reached, hackers from the latter camp founded Symbolics, with the aid of Russ Noftsker, an AI Lab administrator. Symbolics recruited most of the remaining hackers including notable hacker Bill Gosper, who then left the AI Lab. Symbolics also forced Greenblatt to resign by citing MIT policies. While both companies delivered proprietary software, Stallman believed that LMI, unlike Symbolics, had tried to avoid hurting the lab's community. For two years, from 1982 to the end of 1983, Stallman worked by himself to clone the output of the Symbolics programmers, to prevent them from gaining a monopoly on the lab's computers.

Stallman argues that software users should have the freedom to share with their neighbors and be able to study and make changes to the software that they use. He maintains that attempts by proprietary software vendors to prohibit these acts are antisocial and unethical. The phrase "software wants to be free" is often incorrectly attributed to him, and Stallman argues that this is a misstatement of his philosophy. He argues that freedom is vital for the sake of users and society as a moral value, and not merely for pragmatic reasons such as possibly developing technically superior software. Eric S. Raymond, one of the creators of the open-source movement, argues that moral arguments, rather than pragmatic ones, alienate potential allies and hurt the end goal of removing code secrecy.

In February 1984, Stallman quit his job at MIT to work full-time on the GNU project, which he had announced in September 1983. Since then, he had remained affiliated with MIT as an unpaid "visiting scientist" in the Computer Science and Artificial Intelligence Laboratory. Until "around 1998", he maintained an office at the Institute that doubled as his legal residence.

== GNU project ==
Stallman announced the plan for the GNU operating system in September 1983 on several ARPANET mailing lists and USENET. He started the project on his own and describes: "As an operating system developer, I had the right skills for this job. So even though I could not take success for granted, I realized that I was elected to do the job. I chose to make the system compatible with Unix so that it would be portable, and so that Unix users could easily switch to it."

In 1985, Stallman published the GNU Manifesto, which outlined his motivation for creating a free operating system called GNU, which would be compatible with Unix. The name GNU is a recursive acronym for "GNU's Not Unix". Soon after, he started a nonprofit corporation called the Free Software Foundation to employ free software programmers and provide a legal infrastructure for the free software movement. Stallman was the nonsalaried president of the FSF, which is a 501(c)(3) nonprofit organization founded in Massachusetts.

Stallman popularized the concept of copyleft, a legal mechanism to protect the modification and redistribution rights for free software. It was first implemented in the GNU Emacs General Public License, and in 1989 the first program-independent GNU General Public License (GPL) was released. By then, much of the GNU system had been completed.

Stallman was responsible for contributing many necessary tools, including a text editor (GNU Emacs), compiler (GCC), debugger (GNU Debugger), and a build automator (GNU make). The notable omission was a kernel. In 1990, members of the GNU project began using Carnegie Mellon's Mach microkernel in a project called GNU Hurd, which has yet to achieve the maturity level required for full POSIX compliance.

In 1991, Linus Torvalds, a Finnish student studying at the University of Helsinki, used the GNU's development tools to produce the free monolithic Linux kernel. The existing programs from the GNU project were readily ported to run on the resultant platform. Most sources use the name Linux to refer to the general-purpose operating system thus formed, while Stallman and the FSF call it GNU/Linux. This has been a longstanding naming controversy in the free software community. Stallman argues that not using GNU in the name of the operating system unfairly disparages the value of the GNU project and harms the sustainability of the free software movement by breaking the link between the software and the free software philosophy of the GNU project.

Stallman's influences on hacker culture include the name POSIX and the Emacs editor. On Unix systems, GNU Emacs's popularity rivaled that of another editor vi, spawning an editor war. Stallman's take on this was to canonize himself as St. IGNUcius of the Church of Emacs and acknowledge that "vi vi vi is the editor of the beast", while "using a free version of vi is not a sin; it is a penance".

In 1992, developers at Lucid Inc. doing their own work on Emacs clashed with Stallman and ultimately forked the software into what would become XEmacs. The technology journalist Andrew Leonard has characterized what he sees as Stallman's uncompromising stubbornness as common among elite computer programmers:

There's something comforting about Stallman's intransigence. Win or lose, Stallman will never give up. He'll be the stubbornest mule on the farm until the day he dies. Call it fixity of purpose, or just plain cussedness, his single-minded commitment and brutal honesty are refreshing in a world of spin-meisters and multimillion-dollar marketing campaigns.

In 2018, Stallman instituted "Kind Communication Guidelines" for the GNU project to help its mailing list discussions remain constructive while avoiding explicitly promoting diversity.

In October 2019, a public statement signed by 33 maintainers of the GNU project asserted that Stallman's behaviour had "undermined a core value of the GNU project: the empowerment of all computer users" and called for "GNU maintainers to collectively decide about the organization of the project". The statement was published soon after Stallman resigned as president of the FSF and left his "visiting scientist" role at MIT in September 2019. In spite of that, Stallman remained head of the GNU project.

== Activism ==
Stallman has written many essays on software freedom, and has been an outspoken political campaigner for the free software movement since the early 1990s. The speeches he has regularly given are titled The GNU Project and the Free Software Movement, The Dangers of Software Patents, and Copyright and Community in the Age of Computer Networks. In 2006 and 2007, during the eighteen month public consultation for the drafting of version 3 of the GNU General Public License, he added a fourth topic explaining the proposed changes.

Stallman's staunch advocacy for free software inspired the creation of the Virtual Richard M. Stallman (vrms), software that analyzes the packages currently installed on a Debian system, and reports those that are from the non-free tree. Stallman disagrees with parts of Debian's definition of free software.

In 1999, Stallman called for development of a free online encyclopedia through the means of inviting the public to contribute articles. The resulting GNUPedia was eventually retired in favour of the emerging Wikipedia, which had similar aims and was enjoying greater success. Stallman was on the Advisory Council of Latin American television station teleSUR from its launch but resigned in February 2011, criticizing pro-Gaddafi propaganda during the Arab Spring.

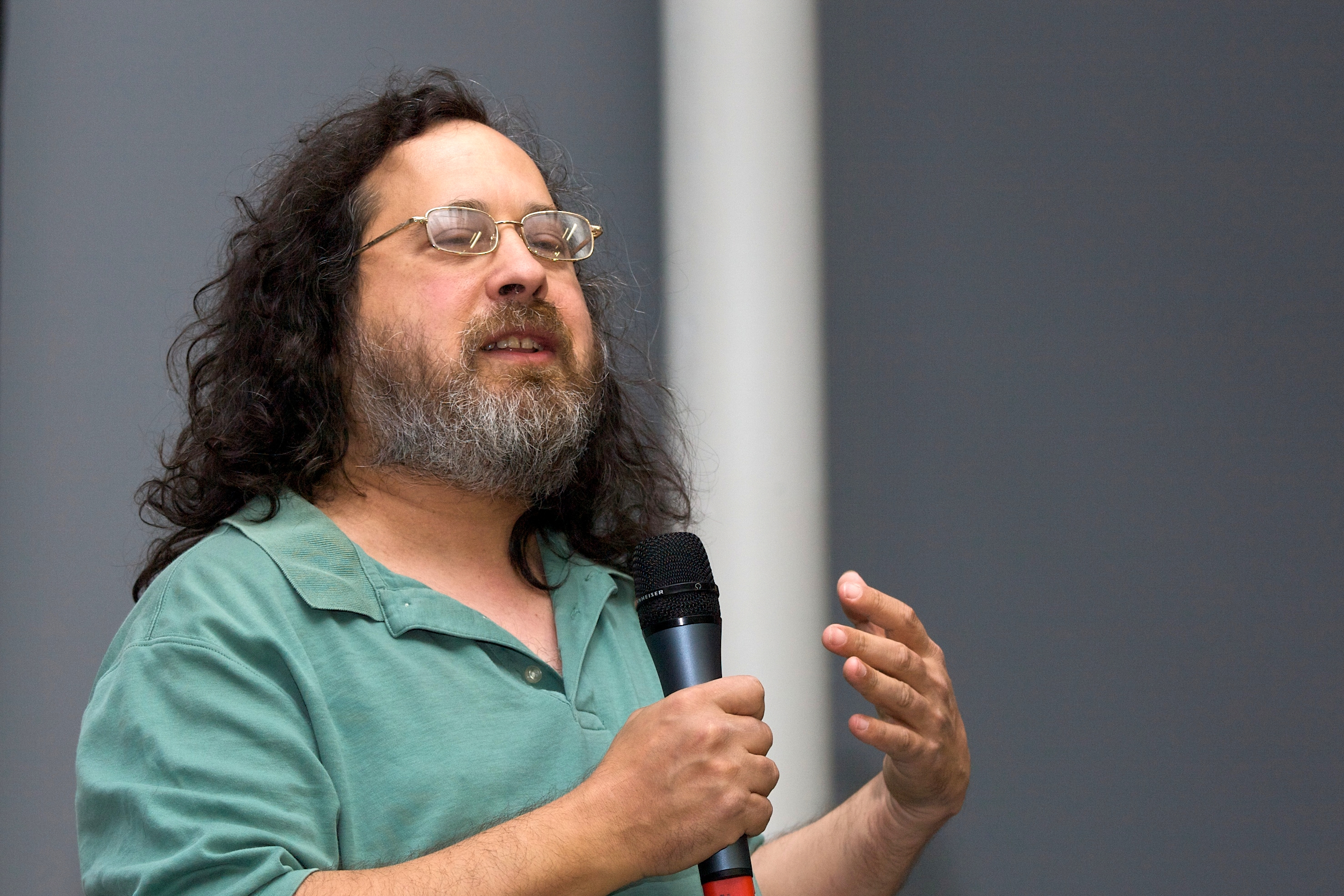
Stallman giving a speech on "Free Software and Your Freedom" at the biennale du design of Saint-Étienne (2008)

In August 2006, at his meetings with the government of the Indian State of Kerala, he persuaded officials to discard proprietary software, such as Microsoft's, at state-run schools. This has resulted in a landmark decision to switch all school computers in 12,500 high schools from Windows to a free software operating system.

After personal meetings, Stallman obtained positive statements about the free software movement from the then-president of India, A. P. J. Abdul Kalam, French 2007 presidential candidate Ségolène Royal, and the president of Ecuador Rafael Correa.

Stallman has participated in protests about software patents, digital rights management, and proprietary software.

Protesting against proprietary software in April 2006, Stallman held a "Don't buy from ATI, enemy of your freedom" placard at an invited talk given by an ATI compiler architect in the building where Stallman worked, resulting in the police being called. AMD has since acquired ATI and has taken steps to make their hardware documentation available for use by the free software community.

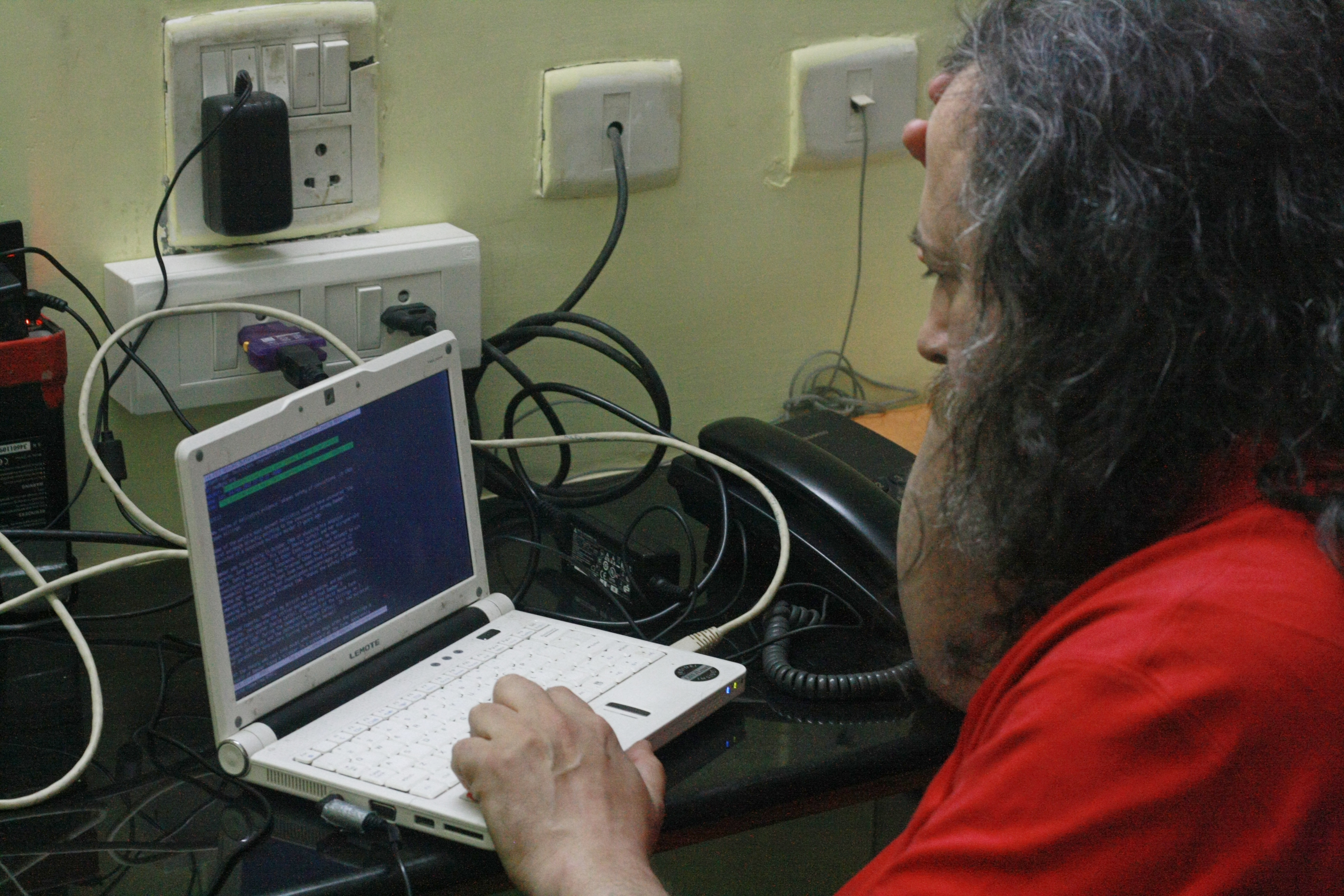
Stallman using his Lemote machine at Indian Institute of Technology Madras, Chennai

Stallman has characterized Steve Jobs as having a "malign influence" on computing because of Jobs' leadership in guiding Apple to produce closed platforms. According to Stallman, while Jobs was at NeXT, Jobs asked Stallman if he could distribute a modified GCC in two parts, one part under GPL and the other part, an Objective-C preprocessor under a proprietary license. Stallman initially thought this would be legal, but since he also thought it would be "very undesirable for free software", he asked a lawyer for advice. The response he got was that judges would consider such schemes to be "subterfuges" and would be very harsh toward them, and a judge would ask whether it was "really" one program, rather than how the parts were labeled. Therefore, Stallman sent a message back to Jobs which said they believed Jobs' plan was not allowed by the GPL, which resulted in NeXT releasing the Objective-C front end under GPL.

For a period of time, Stallman used a notebook from the One Laptop per Child program. Stallman's computer is a refurbished ThinkPad X200 with Libreboot (a free BIOS replacement), and Trisquel. Before the ThinkPad X200, Stallman used a ThinkPad T400s with Libreboot and Trisquel. And before the T400s, Stallman used a ThinkPad X60, and even further back in time, a Lemote Yeeloong netbook (using the same company's Loongson processor) which he chose because, like the X200, X60 and the T400s, it could run with free software at the BIOS level, stating "freedom is my priority. I've campaigned for freedom since 1983, and I am not going to surrender that freedom for the sake of a more convenient computer." Stallman's Lemote was stolen from him in 2012 while he was in Argentina. Before Trisquel, Stallman has used the gNewSense operating system.

=== Copyright reduction ===
Stallman has regularly given a talk entitled "Copyright vs. Community" where he reviews the state of digital rights management (DRM) and names many of the products and corporations which he boycotts. His approach to DRM is best summed up by the FSF Defective by Design campaign. In the talks, he makes proposals for a "reduced copyright" and suggests a 10-year limit on copyright. He suggests that, instead of restrictions on sharing, authors be supported using a tax, with revenues distributed among them based on cubic roots of their popularity to ensure that "fairly successful non-stars" receive a greater share than they do now (compare with private copying levy which is associated with proponents of strong copyright), or a convenient anonymous micropayment system for people to support authors directly. He indicates that no form of non-commercial sharing of copies should be considered a copyright violation. He has advocated for civil disobedience in a comment on Ley Sinde.

He has reportedly refused to autograph anything bearing a '©' symbol, in line with his views.

Stallman has helped and supported the International Music Score Library Project get back online, after it had been taken down on October 19, 2007, following a cease and desist letter from Universal Edition.

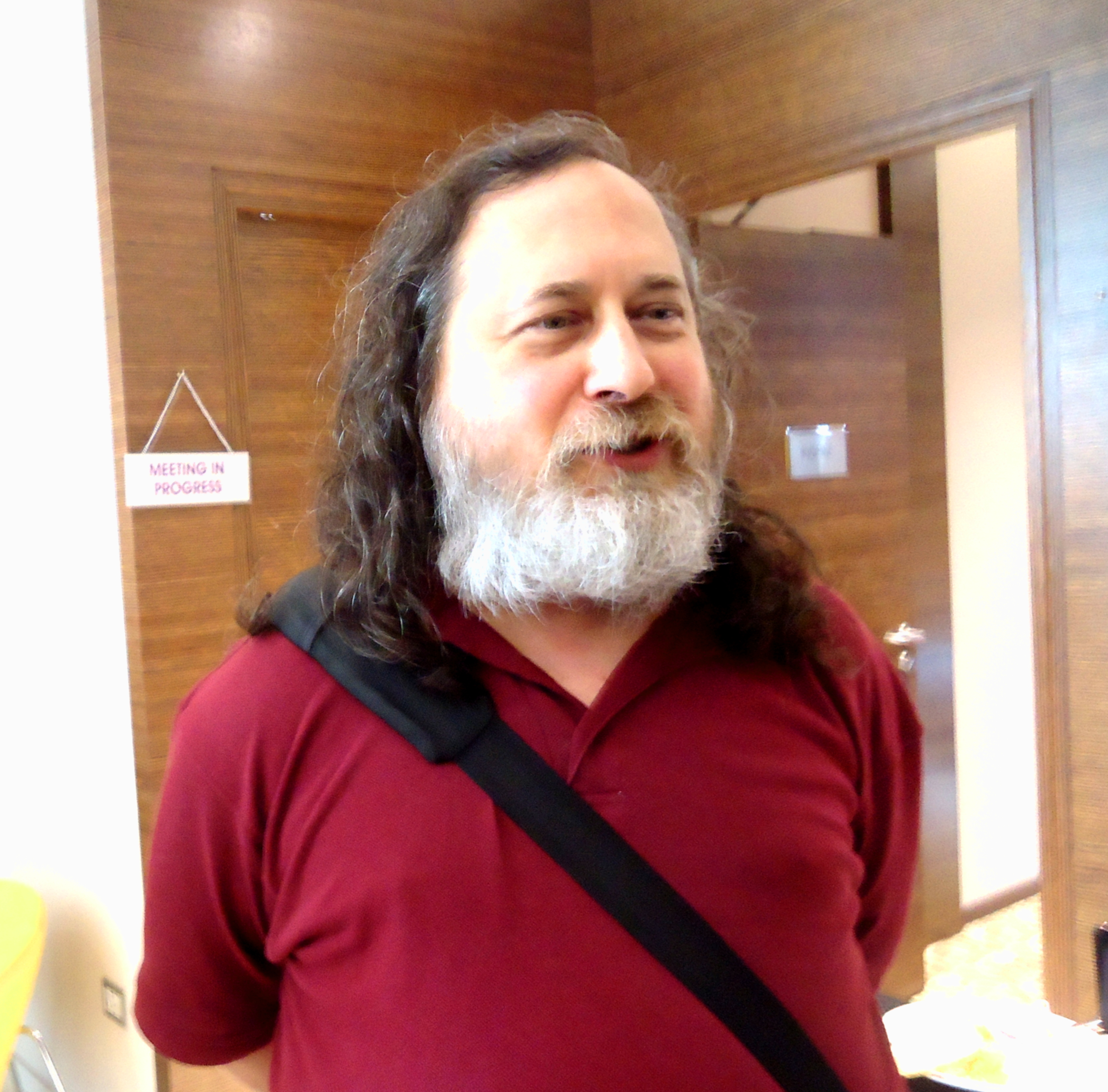
Stallman at Swatantra 2014, a conference organized by ICFOSS in Kerala, India

Stallman mentions the dangers some e-books bring compared to paper books, with the example of the Amazon Kindle e-reader that prevents the copying of e-books and allows Amazon to order automatic deletion of a book. He says that such e-books present a big step backward with respect to paper books by being less easy to use, copy, lend to others or sell, also mentioning that Amazon e-books cannot be bought anonymously. His short story "The Right to Read" provides a picture of a dystopian future if the right to share books is impeded. He objects to many of the terms within typical end-user license agreements that accompany e-books. He discourages the use of several storage technologies such as DVD or Blu-ray video discs because the content of such media is encrypted. He considers manufacturers' use of encryption on non-secret data (to force the user to view certain promotional material) as a conspiracy.

Stallman recognized the Sony BMG copy protection rootkit scandal to be a criminal act by Sony and supports a general boycott of Sony for its legal actions against George Hotz. Stallman has suggested that the United States government may encourage the use of software as a service because this would allow them to access users' data without needing a search warrant. He denies being an anarchist despite his wariness of some legislation and the fact that he has "advocated strongly for user privacy and his own view of software freedom".

=== Terminologies ===
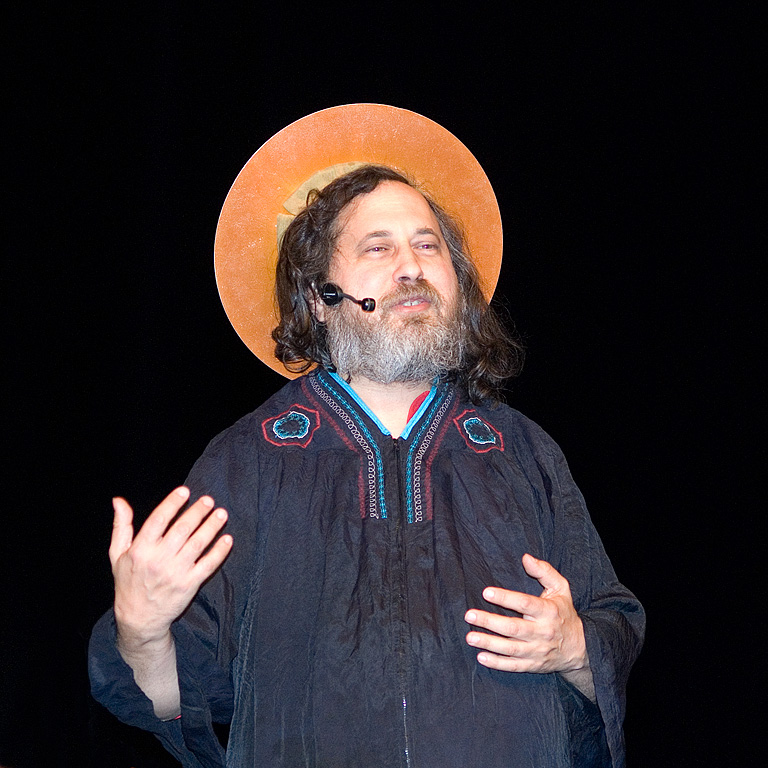
Stallman, in costume as St. IGNUcius, wearing a halo consisting of the platter of an old hard disk drive (Monastir, Tunisia, 2012)

Stallman places great importance on the words and labels people use to talk about the world, including the relationship between software and freedom. He asks people to say free software and GNU/Linux, and to avoid the terms intellectual property and piracy (in relation to copying not approved by the publisher). One of his criteria for giving an interview to a journalist is that the journalist agrees to use his terminology throughout the article.

Stallman argues that the term intellectual property is designed to confuse people, and is used to prevent intelligent discussion on the specifics of copyright, patent, trademark, and other areas of law by lumping together things that are more dissimilar than similar. He also argues that by referring to these laws as property laws, the term biases the discussion when thinking about how to treat these issues, writing:

These laws originated separately, evolved differently, cover different activities, have different rules, and raise different public policy issues. Copyright law was designed to promote authorship and art, and covers the details of a work of authorship or art. Patent law was intended to encourage publication of ideas, at the price of finite monopolies over these ideas–a price that may be worth paying in some fields and not in others. Trademark law was not intended to promote any business activity, but simply to enable buyers to know what they are buying.

==== Open source and Free software ====
His requests that people use certain terms, and his ongoing efforts to convince people of the importance of terminology, are a source of regular misunderstanding and friction with parts of the free software and open-source communities. After initially accepting the concept, Stallman rejects a common alternative term, open-source software, because it does not call to mind what Stallman sees as the value of the software: freedom. He wrote, "Free software is a political movement; open source is a development model." Thus, he believes that the use of the term will not inform people of the freedom issues, and will not lead to people valuing and defending their freedom. Two alternatives which Stallman does accept are software libre and unfettered software, but free software is the term he asks people to use in English. For similar reasons, he argues for the term proprietary software or non-free software rather than closed-source software, when referring to software that is not free software.

==== Linux and GNU ====
Stallman asks that the term GNU/Linux, which he pronounces /ɡnuː slæʃ ˈlɪnəks/ GNOO SLASH LIN-əks, be used to refer to the operating system created by combining the GNU system and the kernel Linux. Stallman refers to this operating system as "a variant of GNU, and the GNU Project is its principal developer". He claims that the connection between the GNU project's philosophy and its software is broken when people refer to the combination as merely Linux. Starting around 2003, he began also using the term GNU+Linux, which he pronounces /ɡnuː plʌs ˈlɪnəks/ GNOO PLUS LIN-əks, to prevent others from pronouncing the phrase GNU/Linux as /ɡnuː ˈlɪnəks/ GNOO LIN-əks, which would erroneously imply that the kernel Linux is maintained by the GNU project. The creator of Linux, Linus Torvalds, has publicly said that he objects to modification of the name and that the rename "is their [the FSF] confusion not ours".

=== Surveillance resistance ===
Stallman professes admiration for Julian Assange and Edward Snowden. He has spoken against government and corporate surveillance on many occasions.

He refers to mobile phones as "portable surveillance and tracking devices", refusing to own a cell phone due to the lack of phones running entirely on free software. He also avoids using a key card to enter his office building since key card systems track each location and time that someone enters the building using a card. He usually does not browse the web directly from his personal computer. Instead, he uses GNU Womb's grab-url-from-mail utility, an email-based proxy which downloads the webpage content and then emails it to the user. In a 2016 interview, he said that he accesses all websites via Tor, except for Wikipedia (which generally disallows editing from Tor).

== Comments about Jeffrey Epstein scandal ==
In September 2019, it was learned that Jeffrey Epstein had made donations to MIT, and in the wake of this, MIT Media Lab director Joi Ito resigned. An internal MIT CSAIL listserv mailing list thread was started to protest the coverup of MIT's connections to Epstein. In the thread, discussion had turned to deceased MIT professor Marvin Minsky, who was named by Virginia Giuffre as one of the people that Maxwell had directed her to go have sex with. Giuffre, a minor at the time, had been caught in Epstein's underage sex trafficking ring.

Stallman was unambiguous in his condemnation of Epstein, stating "We know that Giuffre was being coerced into sex–by Epstein. She was being harmed." In the same thread, in response to a comment saying that Minsky "is accused of assaulting one of Epstein's victims", Stallman disputed the wording, arguing that it was not clear Minsky knew Giuffre was being coerced, and that Epstein would have had reason to conceal that from associates. He also argued that the moral harm to the victim does not depend on technical legal definitions, stating "It is morally absurd to define 'rape' in a way that depends on minor details such as which country it was in or whether the victim was 18 years old or 17".

Stallman's comments, along with a compilation of accusations against him, were published via Medium by Selam Gano, who called for him to be removed from MIT. Vice published a copy of the email chain on September 13, 2019. Tied to his comments regarding Minsky, several called for Stallman's resignation. Separately, older writings by Stallman from 2013 and earlier on underage sex and child pornography laws resurfaced during the controversy. On September 14, 2019, Stallman acknowledged that since the time of those writings, he had learned that there were problems with underage sex, writing on his blog: "Through personal conversations in recent years, I've learned to understand how sex with a child can harm per psychologically. This changed my mind about the matter: I think adults should not do that."

On September 16, 2019, Stallman announced his resignation from both MIT and FSF, "due to pressure on MIT and me over a series of misunderstandings and mischaracterizations". In a post on his website, Stallman asserted that his posts to the email lists were not to defend Epstein and that he had previously called Epstein a 'serial rapist'.

=== Return to FSF ===
In March 2021, at LibrePlanet2021, Stallman announced his return to the FSF board of directors. An open letter asking for the FSF to retain Stallman was published, arguing that his statements had been mischaracterized, misunderstood, and needed to be interpreted in context. The FSF board on April 12 made a statement re-affirming its decision to bring back Stallman. After that, Stallman issued a statement apologizing and explaining his poor social skills.

Shortly thereafter, a separate open letter was also published on GitHub asking for the removal of Stallman along with the entire FSF board of directors, supported by prominent open-source organizations including GNOME and Mozilla, and including a list of accusations against Stallman. Multiple organizations criticized, defunded, and/or cut ties with the FSF including Red Hat, the Free Software Foundation Europe, the Software Freedom Conservancy, SUSE, the OSI, the Document Foundation, the EFF, and the Tor Project. Debian declined to issue a statement after a community vote on the matter. However, the FSF noted that this had relatively little financial impact, as direct financial support from corporations accounted for less than 3% of its revenue in the most recent fiscal year.

== Personal life ==
Stallman lives in Boston and moved there after living in Cambridge, Massachusetts for many years. He speaks English, French, Spanish and some Indonesian. He has said that he is "an atheist of Jewish ancestry" and often wears a button that reads "Impeach God". He says he is childfree. He denies having autism, but has sometimes speculated whether he could have a "shadow" version of it.

In September 2023, while giving his keynote presentation at the GNU 40th anniversary event, Stallman revealed he had been diagnosed with follicular lymphoma, a form of cancer, and said that his prognosis was good and he hopes to be around for years to come. He later stated he was in remission and he was getting treatment.

== Honors and awards ==
- 1986: Honorary lifetime membership of the Chalmers University of Technology Computer Society
- 1990: Exceptional merit award MacArthur Fellowship ("genius grant")
- 1990: The Association for Computing Machinery's Grace Murray Hopper Award "For pioneering work in the development of the extensible editor EMACS (Editing Macros)"
- 1996: Honorary doctorate from Sweden's Royal Institute of Technology
- 1998: Electronic Frontier Foundation's Pioneer Award
- 1999: Yuri Rubinsky Memorial Award
- 2001: The Takeda Techno-Entrepreneurship Award for Social/Economic Well-Being (武田研究奨励賞)
- 2001: Honorary doctorate from the University of Glasgow
- 2002: US National Academy of Engineering membership "for starting the GNU project, which produced influential, non-proprietary software tools, and for founding the free software movement"
- 2003: Honorary doctorate from the Vrije Universiteit Brussel
- 2004: Honorary doctorate from the Universidad Nacional de Salta
- 2004: Honorary professorship from the Universidad Nacional de Ingeniería del Perú
- 2007: Honorary professorship from the Inca Garcilaso de la Vega University
- 2007: First Premio Internacional Extremadura al Conocimiento Libre
- 2007: Honorary doctorate from the Universidad de Los Angeles de Chimbote
- 2007: Honorary doctorate, from the University of Pavia
- 2008: Honorary doctorate from the Universidad Nacional de Trujillo, in Peru
- 2009: Honorary doctorate from Lakehead University
- 2011: Honorary doctorate from National University of Córdoba
- 2012: Honorary professorship from the Universidad César Vallejo de Trujillo in Peru
- 2012: Honorary doctorate from the Universidad Latinoamericana Cima de Tacna in Peru
- 2012: Honorary doctorate from the Universidad José Faustino Sánchez Carrión, in Peru
- 2014: Honorary doctorate from Concordia University in Montréal
- 2015: ACM Software System Award "For the development and leadership of GCC"
- 2016: Honorary doctorate from Pierre and Marie Curie University
- 2016: Social Medicine award from GNU Solidario

== Selected publications ==
Manuals

- Stallman, Richard M. (1980). EMACS: The Extensible, Customizable, Self-Documenting Display Editor. Cambridge, Massachusetts, USA: MIT Artificial Intelligence Laboratory publication. AIM-519A.
- Stallman, Richard M. (2002). GNU Emacs Manual. Boston, Massachusetts, USA: GNU Press. ISBN 1-882114-85-X.
- Stallman, Richard M.; McGrath, Roland; Smith, Paul D. (2004). GNU Make: A Program for Directed Compilation. Boston, Massachusetts, USA: GNU Press. ISBN 1-882114-83-3.
- Stallman, Richard M.; Rothwell, Trevis; Beebe, Nelson (2023). GNU C Language Introduction and Reference Manual. GNU.

Selected essays

- Stallman, Richard M. (2015). Free Software, Free Society: Selected Essays of Richard M. Stallman (Third ed.). Boston, Massachusetts, USA: GNU Press. ISBN 978-0-9831592-5-4.

== See also ==
- 9882 Stallman, a minor planet named after Richard
- Free as in Freedom, a biography by Sam Williams
- Free Software Street
- History of free and open-source software
- Lisp Machine Lisp
- Revolution OS
- List of pioneers in computer science
