= Curl (programming language) =

Programming language

- Paradigms: multi-paradigm: object-oriented, markup
- Designed by: Steve Ward, MIT
- Developer: Curl, Inc., Sumisho Computer Systems Corp., SCSK Corporation
- First appeared: 1998; 28 years ago
- Stable release: 8.0.15 / 16 October 2025; 5 months ago
- Typing discipline: strong
- OS: Windows
- License: Curl license www.curl.com/products/license/
- Website: www.curl.com

Dialects
- none

Influenced by
- HTML, JavaScript, Lisp

Curl is a reflective object-oriented programming language for interactive web applications, whose goal is to provide a smoother transition between content formatting and computer programming. It makes it possible to embed complex objects in simple documents without needing to switch between programming languages or development platforms. The Curl implementation initially consisted of an interpreter only; a compiler was added later.

Curl combines text markup (as in HyperText Markup Language (HTML)), scripting (as in JavaScript), and heavy-duty computing (as in Java, C#, or C++) within one unified framework. It is used in a range of internal enterprise, business-to-business (B2B), and business-to-consumer (B2C) applications.

Curl programs may be compiled into Curl applets, that are viewed using the Curl RTE, a runtime environment with a plugin for web browsers. Currently, it is supported on Microsoft Windows. Linux and macOS was dropped on March 25, 2019 (starting with version 8.0.10). Curl supports "detached applets", which is a web deployed applet which runs on the user's desktop independent of a browser window much as in Microsoft Silverlight 3 and Adobe AIR.

== Architecture ==
The Curl language attempts to address a long-standing problem: A web application often has components that are written in different languages, tools, and frameworks. The final, and often most difficult, hurdle has been getting these blocks to communicate with each other in a consistent manner. Curl attempts to side-step these problems by providing a consistent syntactic and semantic interface at all levels of web content creation.

Curl is a markup language like HTML—that is, plain text is shown as text; at the same time, Curl includes an object-oriented programming language that supports multiple inheritance. Curl applications are not required to observe the separation of information, style, and behavior that HTML, Cascading Style Sheets (CSS), and JavaScript have imposed, although that style of programming can be used in Curl if desired.

While the Curl language can be used as an HTML replacement for presenting formatted text, its abilities range all the way to those of a compiled, strongly typed, object-oriented system programming language. Both the authoring (HTML-level) and programming constructs of Curl can be extended in user code. The language is designed so Curl applications can be compiled to native code of the client machine by a just-in-time compiler and run at high speed. Curl applets can also be written so that they can run off-line when disconnected from a network (occasionally connected computing). The Curl IDE is an application written in Curl.

== Syntax ==
A simple Curl applet for a "Hello, World!" program might be:

 {Curl 7.0, 8.0 applet}
 {text
    color = "blue",
    font-size = 16pt,
    Hello World}

This code will run if the user has at least one of the Curl versions 7.0 or 8.0 installed.

Curl provides both macros and text-procedures in addition to anonymous procedures and named methods. An alternative using the text-procedure paragraph would be:

 {paragraph
    paragraph-left-indent=0.5in,
    {text color = "red", font-size = 12pt,
      Hello}
    {text color = "green", font-size = 12pt,
      World}}

Recently this style of layout has been adopted by "builders" in the Groovy language for the Java virtual machine (JVM), but is also familiar to users of CSS or Tcl/Tk. Most features for web applications now implemented through combinations of JavaScript libraries + HTML + CSS are already found within the Curl language, including features usually associated with Prototype + script.aculo.us such as accordion panes.

Curl sets callbacks in the manner also adopted by Groovy:

 {CommandButton width=100pt,
    height = 50pt,
    label = {center {bold Invokes an event handler when clicked}},
    control-color = "orange",
    || Attach the following event handler to this CommandButton
    {on Action do
        {popup-message
            title = "Your Message",
            "This is a user message dialog."
        }
    }}

Curl comments use the vertical bar in several variations. The simplest is as follows:

 {text A comment can be on a line by itself,
 || A comment on a line by itself
 or it can be at the end || A comment on the same line as code
 of a line.}

== As lightweight markup ==
Because Curl provides for both user-defined text procedures and style sheets, it can be used readily as domain-specific lightweight markup. A major advantage over plain text HTML markup is that the text encoding can be set to UTF-8, and text entered in a Unicode-enabled text editor with no escaping of characters (like JavaScript, Curl is Unicode friendly). A poetry example is:

 {poem || wraps entire poem
    {stanza  || first verse here in any language
    }
    {stanza  || another verse here in any language
    }
 }

which can initially be implemented by defining the poem and stanza markup as paragraph text formats. Stanza could be further refined to include a hidden navigation anchor for page navigation using the Curl {destination} which is itself a text procedure.

The same markup can be used for different results, as one can style text to be visible in one context and invisible in another. Curl also permits top-level file inclusion so that a source text in markup can be included in different parent files. In education, for example, one could create a source file of test questions, and include it in both a student and a teacher version of the text.

== See also ==
- Homoiconicity: Curl is both a programming language and a data format
