= Steve Ward (computer scientist) =

American computer scientist

Steve Ward is Professor of Computer Science and Engineering at MIT, where his recent teaching and research activities revolve around areas of computer system architecture. He holds three degrees from MIT – a Bachelor of Science and a Master of Science in Electrical Engineering and a PhD in Computer Science.

One of his research projects, the 1979 Nu machine, became a model for microprocessor-based workstations. Numerous software products have been created due to inspiration of its UNIX port and system software, and the NuBus was an industry standard from the late 1980s to the mid 1990s. In the late 1970s Professor Steve Ward and his research group at MIT's Laboratory for Computer Science (LCS) developed the TRIX operating system. Ward's inventions include a novel dynamic memory chip architecture and a real-time controller design. He was involved with the Curl project, which aimed to formulate a new language for creating web documents with almost any sort of content, from simple formatted text to complex interactive applets, in the 90s. In the early 2000s he worked on organic computing – alternative ways of building systems so that they behave more like organisms than like conventional computer systems.
