= Texas Instruments Explorer =

The Texas Instruments Explorer is a family of Lisp machine computers. These computers were sold by Texas Instruments (TI) in the 1980s. The Explorer is based on a design from Lisp Machines Incorporated, which is based on the MIT Lisp machine. The Explorer was used to develop and deploy artificial intelligence software.

Notable is also the early use of the NuBus as the system bus for the Explorer computer family.

== History ==
The Explorer was used to develop and deploy artificial intelligence software. Later models were based on a special 32-bit microprocessor developed by TI, which hardware had enhanced support for executing Lisp software.

== Operating system ==
The operating system of the Explorer was written in Lisp Machine Lisp and also supported Common Lisp.

== Use ==
A notable application is SPIKE, the scheduling system for the Hubble Space Telescope. SPIKE was developed on Texas Instruments Explorer workstations.

== Models ==
- Explorer
- Explorer II, based on the Lisp microprocessor
- Explorer LX, which combines the Explorer with a co-processor running a version of Unix (TI System V)
- MicroExplorer, a NuBus board for the Apple Macintosh based on the Lisp microprocessor

== Publications ==
- Software innovations for the Texas Instruments Explorer computer, Tennant, H.R.; Bate, R.R.; Corey, S.M.; Davis, L.; Kline, P.; Oren, L.G.; Rajinikanth, M.; Saenz, R.; Stenger, D.; Thompson, C.W., Proceedings of the IEEE Volume 73, Issue 12, Dec. 1985 Page(s): 1771 - 1790
- Artificial intelligence hardware architectures for the Space Station era: The Texas Instruments Explorer and Compact LISP Machine, Krueger, S.; Manuel, G.; Matthews, G.; Ott, G.; Watkins, C., Opt. Eng.; Vol/Issue: 25:11
- Dussud, P. H. 1988. Lisp hardware architecture: the Explorer II and beyond. SIGPLAN Lisp Pointers 1, 6 (Apr. 1988), 13–18. http://doi.acm.org/10.1145/1317224.1317226
- P.H. Dussud, TICLOS: An implementation of CLOS for the Explorer Family, In Proc. OOPSLA'89, International Conference on Object-Oriented Programming, Systems, Languages and Applications, 1989, pp. 215–219.
- Zeitgeist: Database Support for Object-Oriented Programming (1988), by S Ford, J Joseph, D Langworthy, D Lively, G Pathak, E Perez, R. Peterson, D. Sparacin, S. Thatte, D. Wells, S. Agarwal, In Proceedings of the Second International Workshop on Object-Oriented Database Systems (Zeitgeist was an OODBMS developed by Texas Instruments for the Explorer)
