= Russell Noftsker =

American entrepreneur (born 1942)

- Born: February 15, 1942 (age 84)
- Education: BSEE
- Alma mater: New Mexico State University
- Occupation: Computer scientist
- Known for: Symbolics, Lisp machines

Russell Noftsker is an American entrepreneur who founded Symbolics, a computer company, and was its first chairman and president.

== Biography ==
Russell Noftsker was born February 1942 and graduated high school in Carlsbad, New Mexico. Noftsker earned a degree in engineering from New Mexico State University and was hired in 1965 by Marvin Minsky as the administrator of the Project MAC AI Group, later to become the AI Lab, replacing Dan Edwards, who had recently left that post.

=== Lisp machines and Symbolics ===
Noftsker left the Lab in 1973, but would later return to the Lab. Noftsker and Greenblatt working together with the team of Lisp Machine developers to commercialize the technology. Differences over business strategy and direction split the group from Greenblatt in February 1979. A year later Noftsker and the rest of that group formed Symbolics Inc. with Robert Adams taking on the role of president and chairman.

Noftsker and the then CEO Brian Sear were forced out of Symbolics completely by the board in early 1988 after an internal battle over lowering prices. Noftsker had already been forced to resign as president for 2 months in April 1984 by the board and again in late 1986, retained as chairman & CEO the first time then as Chairman the second.

In 1995 at the invitation of Symbolics customer, Steve Gander of Princeton Capital, Noftsker joined a group which bought the assets of Symbolics out of bankruptcy.

== See also ==
- Hackers: Heroes of the Computer Revolution
