= MIT Computer Science and Artificial Intelligence Laboratory =

Laboratory at US university

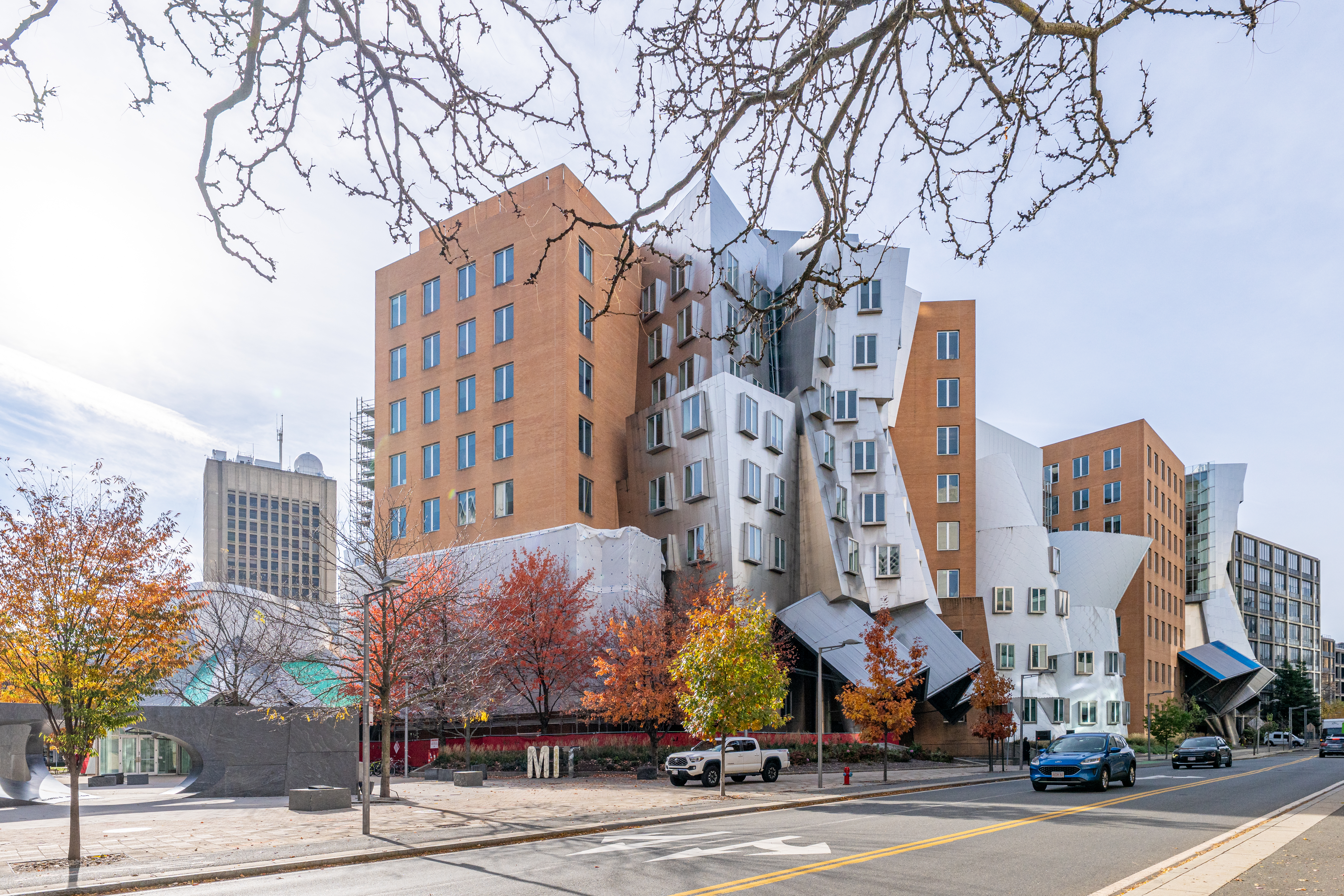
- Nickname: CSAIL
- Established: July 1, 1963; 63 years ago (as Project MAC); July 1, 2003 (as CSAIL)
- Field of research: Computer science
- Director: Daniela L. Rus
- Location: The Stata Center (Building 32); 32 Vassar Street; Cambridge, Massachusetts 02139; USA, Cambridge, Massachusetts
- Operating agency: Massachusetts Institute of Technology
- Website: csail.mit.edu

Computer Science and Artificial Intelligence Laboratory (CSAIL) is a research institute at the Massachusetts Institute of Technology (MIT) formed by the 2003 merger of the Laboratory for Computer Science (LCS) and the Artificial Intelligence Laboratory (AI Lab). Housed within the Ray and Maria Stata Center, CSAIL is the largest on-campus laboratory as measured by research scope and membership. It is part of the Schwarzman College of Computing but is also overseen by the MIT Vice President of Research.

== Research activities ==
CSAIL's research activities are organized around a number of semi-autonomous research groups, each of which is headed by one or more professors or research scientists. These groups are divided up into seven general areas of research:

- Artificial intelligence
- Computational biology
- Graphics and vision
- Language and learning
- Theory of computation
- Robotics
- Systems (includes computer architecture, databases, distributed systems, networks and networked systems, operating systems, programming methodology, and software engineering, among others)

== History ==
Computing Research at MIT began with Vannevar Bush's research into a differential analyzer and Claude Shannon's electronic Boolean algebra in the 1930s, the wartime MIT Radiation Laboratory, the post-war Project Whirlwind and the Research Laboratory of Electronics (RLE), and MIT Lincoln Laboratory's SAGE in the early 1950s. At MIT, research in the field of artificial intelligence began in the late 1950s.

=== Project MAC ===
On July 1, 1963, Project MAC was launched with a $2 million grant from the Advanced Research Projects Agency (ARPA, later DARPA). According to the MIT archives:

They chose the project name MAC in 1963 because it is an acronym for several significant phrases describing the project and its goals. "Machine-Aided Cognition" was the broad objective. A "Multiple-Access Computer" was the principal tool. "Men and Computers" were the essential partners in the expected symbiosis, a term used by J. C. R. Licklider in his 1960 paper entitled "Man-Computer Symbiosis."

Project MAC's first director was Robert Fano of RLE. Fano called MAC a "project" rather than a "laboratory" for reasons of internal MIT politics – if MAC had been called a laboratory, it would have been more difficult to raid other MIT departments for research staff. The DARPA program manager was J. C. R. Licklider, who had previously been at RLE, and who later succeeded Fano as director of Project MAC.

Project MAC became famous for groundbreaking research in operating systems, artificial intelligence, and the theory of computation. Its contemporaries included Project Genie at Berkeley, the Stanford Artificial Intelligence Laboratory, and (somewhat later) University of Southern California's (USC's) Information Sciences Institute.

An "AI Group" including Marvin Minsky (the director), John McCarthy (inventor of Lisp), and a community of computer programmers were incorporated into Project MAC. They were interested principally in the problems of vision, mechanical motion and manipulation, and language, which they view as the keys to more intelligent machines. In the 1960s and 1970s the AI Group developed a time-sharing operating system called Incompatible Timesharing System (ITS) which ran on PDP-6 and later PDP-10 computers.

The early Project MAC community included Fano, Minsky, Licklider, Fernando J. Corbató, and a community of computer programmers and enthusiasts among others who were inspired by John McCarthy. They envisioned the creation of a computer utility whose computational power would be as reliable as an electric utility. To this end, Corbató brought the first computer time-sharing system, Compatible Time-Sharing System (CTSS), with him from the MIT Computation Center, using the DARPA funding to purchase an IBM 7094 for research use.

CTSS was described in an article on time sharing in Scientific American's 1966 special issue on "Information". It had approximately 100 TTY terminals, mostly on campus but with a few in private homes. About 30 users could be logged in at the same time. The project enlisted students in various classes to use the terminals simultaneously in problem solving, simulations, and multi-terminal communications as tests for the multi-access computing software being developed.

One of the early focuses of Project MAC was the development of a successor to CTSS, Multics, which became the first high availability computer system, and a testing ground for the concept of a security kernel. It was initially developed as a part of an industry consortium including General Electric, Bell Laboratories. Following Bell's departure from the project in 1969 and GE's exit from the computer industry in 1970, Project MAC continued to develop Multics throughout the 1970s with Honeywell.

=== AI Lab and the Laboratory for Computer Science ===
In the late 1960s, Minsky's artificial intelligence group sought more space, and was unable to get satisfaction from project director Licklider. Minsky found that although Project MAC as a single entity could not get the additional space he wanted, he could split off to form his own laboratory and then be entitled to more office space. As a result, the MIT AI Lab was formed in 1970, and many of Minsky's AI colleagues left Project MAC to join him in the new laboratory. Programmers such as Richard Stallman, who used TECO to develop EMACS, flourished in the AI Lab during this time. The AI Lab invented Lisp machines, which were commercialized by Symbolics and Lisp Machines Inc. in the 1980s.

Project MAC itself was officially re-named the Laboratory for Computer Science (LCS) in 1976. Participants continued their research into operating systems, programming languages, distributed systems, security kernels, and the theory of computation.

Two professors, Hal Abelson and Gerald Jay Sussman, formed a smaller group positioned between the two. Officially called the MIT Project on Mathematics and Computation (creating a backronym for the discontinued designation "Project MAC"), it was given the playful nickname of "Switzerland" for its ostensible neutrality.

=== CSAIL ===
On the fortieth anniversary of Project MAC's establishment, July 1, 2003, LCS was merged with the AI Lab to form the MIT Computer Science and Artificial Intelligence Laboratory, or CSAIL. This merger created the largest laboratory (over 600 personnel) on the MIT campus.

In 2018, CSAIL launched a five-year collaboration program with IFlytek, a company sanctioned the following year for allegedly using its technology for surveillance and human rights abuses in Xinjiang. In October 2019, MIT announced that it would review its partnerships with sanctioned firms such as iFlyTek and SenseTime. In April 2020, the agreement with iFlyTek was terminated.

CSAIL moved from the School of Engineering to the newly formed Schwarzman College of Computing by February 2020.

== Offices ==
From 1963 to 2004, Project MAC, LCS, the AI Lab, and CSAIL had their offices at 545 Technology Square, taking over more and more floors of the building over the years. In 2004, CSAIL moved to the new Ray and Maria Stata Center, which was built specifically to house it and other departments.

== Outreach activities ==
The IMARA (from Swahili word for "power") group sponsors a variety of outreach programs that bridge the global digital divide. Its aim is to find and implement long-term, sustainable solutions which will increase the availability of educational technology and resources to domestic and international communities. These projects are run under the aegis of CSAIL and staffed by MIT volunteers who give training, install and donate computer setups in greater Boston, Massachusetts, Kenya, Native American Indian tribal reservations in the American Southwest such as the Navajo Nation, the Middle East, and Fiji Islands. The CommuniTech project strives to empower under-served communities through sustainable technology and education and does this through the MIT Used Computer Factory (UCF), providing refurbished computers to under-served families, and through the Families Accessing Computer Technology (FACT) classes, it trains those families to become familiar and comfortable with computer technology.

== Notable researchers ==
(Including members and alumni of CSAIL's predecessor laboratories)

- MacArthur Fellows Tim Berners-Lee, Erik Demaine, Dina Katabi, Daniela L. Rus, Regina Barzilay, Peter Shor, Richard Stallman, and Joshua Tenenbaum
- Turing Award recipients Leonard M. Adleman, Fernando J. Corbató, Shafi Goldwasser, Butler W. Lampson, John McCarthy, Silvio Micali, Marvin Minsky, Ronald L. Rivest, Adi Shamir, Barbara Liskov, and Michael Stonebraker
- IJCAI Computers and Thought Award recipients Terry Winograd, Patrick Winston, David Marr, Gerald Jay Sussman, Rodney Brooks
- Rolf Nevanlinna Prize recipients Madhu Sudan, Peter Shor, Constantinos Daskalakis
- Gödel Prize recipients Shafi Goldwasser (two-time recipient), Silvio Micali, Maurice Herlihy, Charles Rackoff, Johan Håstad, Peter Shor, and Madhu Sudan
- Grace Murray Hopper Award recipients Robert Metcalfe, Shafi Goldwasser, Guy L. Steele, Jr., Richard Stallman, and W. Daniel Hillis
- Textbook authors Harold Abelson and Gerald Jay Sussman, Richard Stallman, Thomas H. Cormen, Charles E. Leiserson, Patrick Winston, Ronald L. Rivest, Barbara Liskov, John Guttag, Jerome H. Saltzer, Frans Kaashoek, Clifford Stein, and Nancy Lynch
- David D. Clark, former chief protocol architect for the Internet; co-author with Jerome H. Saltzer (also a CSAIL member) and David P. Reed of the influential paper "End-to-End Arguments in Systems Design"
- Eric Grimson, expert on computer vision and its applications to medicine, appointed Chancellor of MIT March 2011
- Bob Frankston, co-developer of VisiCalc, the first computer spreadsheet
- Seymour Papert, inventor of the Logo programming language
- Joseph Weizenbaum, creator of the ELIZA computer-simulated therapist

=== Notable alumni ===
- Robert Metcalfe, who later invented Ethernet at Xerox PARC and later founded 3Com
- Marc Raibert, who created the robot company Boston Dynamics
- Drew Houston, co-founder of Dropbox
- Colin Angle and Helen Greiner who, with previous CSAIL director Rodney Brooks, founded iRobot
- Jeremy Wertheimer, who developed ITA Software used by travel websites like Kayak and Orbitz
- Max Krohn, co-founder of OkCupid

== Directors ==
Directors of Project MAC

- Robert Fano, 1963–1968
- J. C. R. Licklider, 1968–1971
- Edward Fredkin, 1971–1974
- Michael Dertouzos, 1974–1975

Directors of the Artificial Intelligence Laboratory

- Marvin Minsky, 1970–1972
- Patrick Winston, 1972–1997
- Rodney Brooks, 1997–2003

Directors of the Laboratory for Computer Science

- Michael Dertouzos, 1975–2001
- Victor Zue, 2001–2003

Directors of CSAIL

- Rodney Brooks, 2003–2007
- Victor Zue, 2007–2011
- Anant Agarwal, 2011–2012
- Daniela L. Rus, 2012–

== CSAIL Alliances ==
CSAIL Alliances is the industry connection arm of MIT’s Computer Science and Artificial Intelligence Laboratory (CSAIL). CSAIL Alliances offers companies programs to connect with the research, faculty, students, and startups of CSAIL by providing organizations with opportunities to learn about the research, engage with students, explore collaborations with researchers, and join research initiatives such as FinTech at CSAIL, MIT Future of Data, and Machine Learning Applications.

== See also ==
- Artificial intelligence
- Glossary of artificial intelligence
- CERIAS
- History of operating systems
- Knight keyboard
- Stanford Artificial Intelligence Laboratory
