= Role-oriented programming =

Programming paradigm based on conceptual understanding of objects

Role-oriented programming as a form of computer programming aims at expressing things in terms that are analogous to human conceptual understanding of the world. This should make programs easier to understand and maintain.

The main idea of role-oriented programming is that humans think in terms of roles. This claim is often backed up by examples of social relations. For example, a student attending a class and the same student at a party are the same person, yet that person plays two different roles. In particular, the interactions of this person with the outside world depend on his current role. The roles typically share features, e.g., the intrinsic properties of being a person. This sharing of properties is often handled by the delegation mechanism.

In the older literature and in the field of databases, it seems that there has been little consideration for the context in which roles interplay with each other. Such a context is being established in newer role- and aspect-oriented programming languages such as Object Teams. Compare the use of "role" as "a set of software programs (services) that enable a server to perform specific functions for users or computers on the network" in Windows Server jargon.

Many researchers have argued the advantages of roles in modeling and implementation. Roles allow objects to evolve over time, they enable independent and concurrently existing views (interfaces) of the object, explicating the different contexts of the object, and separating concerns. Generally roles are a natural element of human daily concept-forming. Roles in programming languages enable objects to have changing interfaces, as we see in real life - things change over time, are used differently in different contexts, etc.

== Authors of role literature ==
- Barbara Pernici
- Bent Bruun Kristensen
- Bruce Wallace
- Charles Bachman
- Friedrich Steimann
- Georg Gottlob
- Kasper B. Graversen
- Kasper Østerbye
- Stephan Herrmann
- Trygve Reenskaug
- Thomas Kühn

== Programming languages with explicit support for roles ==
- EpsilonJ
- JavaScript Delegation - Functions as Roles (Traits and Mixins)
- Object Teams
- Perl (Moose)
- Raku
- powerJava
- SCala ROLes Language

== See also ==
- Aspect-oriented programming
- Data, context and interaction
- Object Oriented Role Analysis Method
- Object-role modeling
- Subject (programming)
- Subject-oriented programming
- Traits (computer science)
