= AspectC++ =

AspectC++ Compiler
- Developers: Olaf Spinczyk (project leader), Georg Blaschke, Christoph Borchert, Benjamin Kramer, Daniel Lohmann, Horst Schirmeier, Ute Spinczyk, Reinhard Tartler, Matthias Urban
- Release: November 6, 2001; 24 years ago
- Stable release: 2.4 / January 22, 2025; 17 months ago
- Written in: C++
- Operating system: Cross-platform
- Type: Source-to-source Compiler
- License: GPL 2+
- Website: www.aspectc.org

AspectC++ is an aspect-oriented extension of C and C++ languages. It has a source-to-source compiler, which translates AspectC++ source code into compilable C++. The compiler is available under the GNU GPL, though some extensions specific to Microsoft Windows are only available through pure-systems GmbH.

Aspect-oriented programming allows modularizing cross-cutting concerns in a single module, an aspect. Aspects can modify existing classes, but most commonly they provide 'advice' that runs before, after, or around existing functionality.

== Example ==
All calls to a specific function can be traced using an aspect, rather than inserting 'cerr' or print statements in many places:

using std::cerr;
using std::endl;

aspect Tracer {
    advice call("% %Iter::Reset(...)") : before() {
        cerr << "about to call Iter::Reset for " << JoinPoint::signature() << endl;
    }
};

The Tracer aspect will print out a message before any call to %Iter::Reset. The %Iter syntax means that it will match all classes that end in Iter.

Each 'matched' location in the source code is called a join point—the advice is joined to (or advises) that code. AspectC++ provides a join point API to provide and access to information about the join point. For example, the function:

JoinPoint::signature()

returns the name of the function (that matched %Iter::Reset) that is about to be called.

The join point API also provides compile-time type information that can be used within an aspect to access the type or the value of the arguments and the return type and return value of a method or function.
