= Pascal Costanza =

German computer scientist

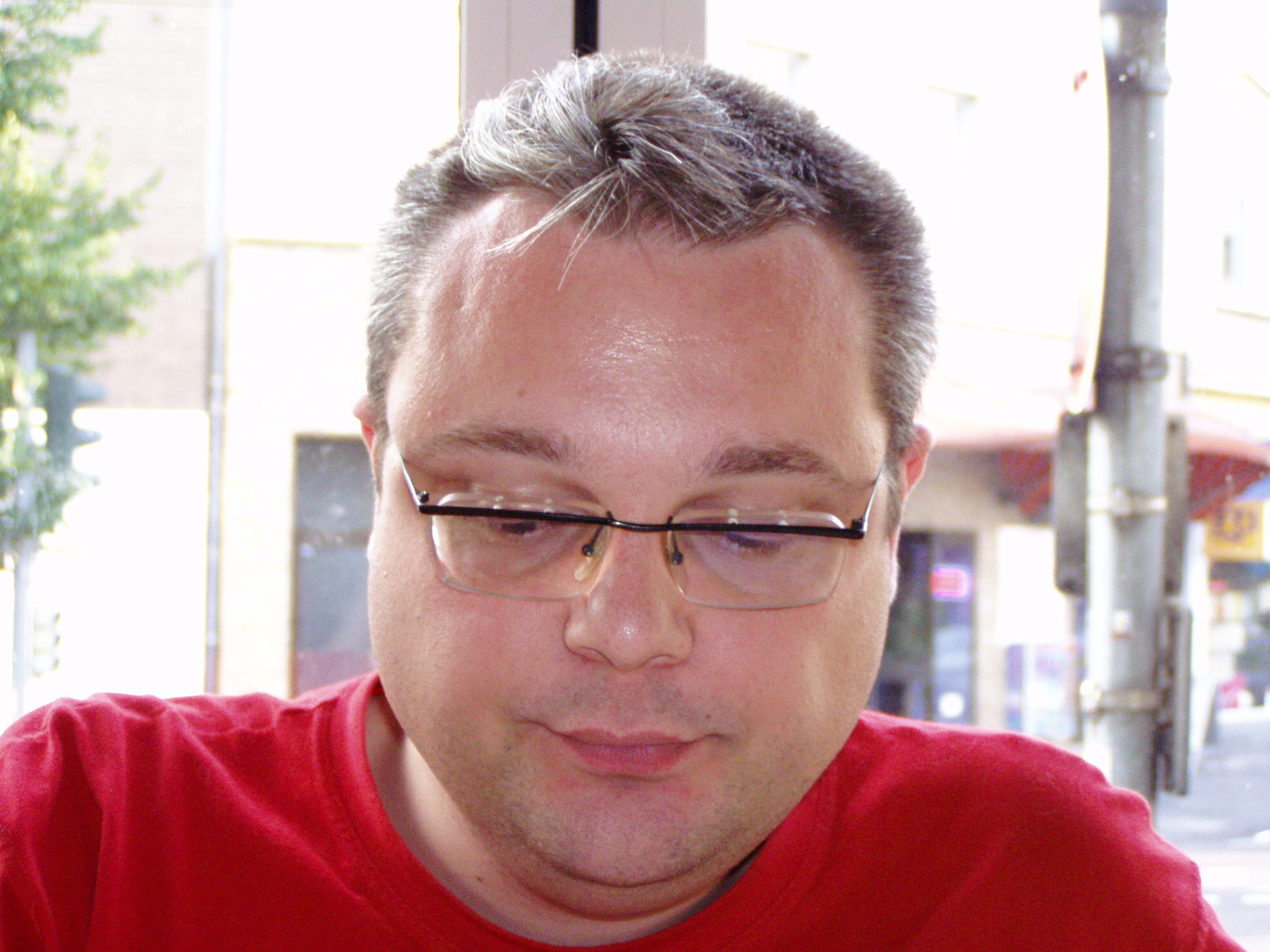
Pascal Costanza.

Pascal Costanza is a research scientist at the ExaScience Lab at Intel Belgium. He is known in the field of functional programming in LISP as well as in the aspect-oriented programming (AOP) community for contributions to this field by applying AOP through Lisp^{1}. More recently, he has developed Context-oriented programming, with Robert Hirschfeld.

His past involvements include specification and implementation of the languages Gilgul and Lava, and the design and application of the JMangler framework for load-time transformation of Java class files. He has also implemented ContextL, the first programming language extension for Context-oriented Programming based on CLOS, and aspect-oriented extensions for CLOS. He is furthermore the initiator and lead of Closer, an open source project that provides a compatibility layer for the CLOS MOP across multiple Common Lisp implementations. He has also co-organized numerous workshops on Unanticipated Software Evolution, Aspect-Oriented Programming, Object Technology for Ambient Intelligence, Lisp, and redefinition of computing. He has a Ph.D. degree from the University of Bonn, Germany.

== Notes ==
1. Dynamically Scoped Functions as the Essence of AOP OOP 2003 Workshop on Object-Oriented Language Engineering for the Post-Java Era, Darmstadt, Germany, July 22, 2003; published in ACM SIGPLAN Notices Volume 38, Issue 8 (August 2003), ACM Press

== Bibliography ==
- JMangler-A Powerful Back-End for Aspect-Oriented Programming (with Günter Kniesel and Michael Austermann), Chapter 15 of Aspect-Oriented Software Development by Robert E. Filman, Tzilla Elrad, Siobhán Clarke, and Mehmet Aksit, Addison-Wesley, 2005, ISBN 0-321-21976-7
- Full bibliography (DBLP, University of Trier)
