= Siobhán Clarke =

Irish computer scientist

Academic background
- Education: Dublin City University
- Thesis: Composition of Object-Oriented Software Design Models (2021)
- Academic advisor: John Murphy

Academic work
- Discipline: Computer science
- Institutions: Trinity College Dublin

Siobhán Clarke is an Irish computer scientist whose research involves software engineering, aspect-oriented programming, middleware, the Internet of things, and smart cities. She is Professor of Software Systems at Trinity College Dublin, in its School of Computer Science and Statistics.

Clarke has a 1986 bachelor's degree from Dublin City University. She worked for IBM for ten years before returning to Dublin City University for a PhD, which she completed in 2001, supervised by John Murphy. She joined Trinity College Dublin in 2000. She is the director of the Enable and Future Cities projects, head of Networks and Distributed Systems in the School of Computer Science and Statistics, and head of the Distributed Systems Group. She is the co-author, with Elisa Baniassad, of Aspect-oriented Analysis and Design: The Theme Approach (2005).

In 2006, Clarke was made a fellow of Trinity College Dublin. Clarke was elected to the Royal Irish Academy in 2023.
