= Pointcut =

In aspect-oriented programming, a pointcut is a set of join points. A pointcut specifies where exactly to apply an advice, which allows separation of concerns and helps in modularizing business logic. Pointcuts are often specified using class names or method names, in some cases using regular expressions that match class or method names. Different frameworks support different Pointcut expressions; AspectJ syntax is considered as de facto standard.

== Background ==
In certain programming languages, cross-cutting concerns are not modularized. Cross-cutting concern refers to parts of software that logically belong to one module and affect the whole system: this could be security or logging, for example. Aspect-oriented programming tries to solve these cross cutting concerns by allowing programmers to write modules called aspects, which contain pieces of code executed at particular point. The expressions required to select a particular point led to creation of Pointcut Expressions.

== Execution ==
Whenever the program execution reaches one of the join points described in the pointcut, a piece of code associated with the pointcut (called advice) is executed. This allows a programmer to describe where and when additional code should be executed in addition to already-defined behavior. Pointcut permits the addition of aspects to existing software, as well as the design of software with a clear separation of concerns, wherein the programmer weaves (merges) different aspects into a complete application.

== Example ==
Suppose there is an application where we can modify records in a database. Whenever users modify the database, we want to have a log of information regarding who is modifying the records. The traditional way to log is to call a log method just before modifying the database. With aspect-oriented programming, we can apply pointcut to the Modify Database method and have an advice that is called to log the required information.

== Expressions ==
Following are some important pointcut expressions supported by AspectJ. These expressions can be combined using logical operators.

execution(void User.setPassword(password))

This pointcut matches execution of the User.setPassword method.

call(void User.getPassword())

When User.getPassword is called, this pointcut is matched.

handler(ArrayIndexOutOfBounds)

Pointcut will match when there is an ArrayIndexOutOfBounds exception

this(UserType)

Pointcut will match when the object currently executing is of UserType.

target(UserType)

Pointcut will match when the target object is of UserType.

within(UserType)

Pointcut will match when the code executing belongs to UserType.

== Criticisms ==
Pointcut languages impact important software properties like evolvability and comprehensibility in a negative way. There might be a possibility where there is a need to perform refactoring to define a correct aspect, which in general should not happen since refactoring is to make code cleaner. It is also not scalable when there are multiple aspects to be applied on the same code and each aspect requires a different refactoring. In general every aspect will be tightly coupled with an application's structure as the pointcuts explicitly contain a method's signature, so when an application changes the pointcut needs to be changed as well. This can be quite problematic for a developer.
