= XDoclet =

Java Attribute-oriented Library

- Stable release: 1.2.3 / May 5, 2005
- Written in: Java
- Operating system: Cross-platform
- Type: Attribute-Oriented Programming for Java
- License: BSD license
- Website: xdoclet.sourceforge.net/xdoclet/ web.archive.org/web/20080314051510/http://xdoclet.codehaus.org/

XDoclet is an open-source code generation library that enables Attribute-oriented programming for Java via insertion of special Javadoc tags. It comes with a library of predefined tags, which simplify coding for various technologies: Java EE, Web services, Portlet etc.

== Example ==
A typical XDoclet comment might look like this:

 /****
  * This is the Account entity bean. It is an example of how to use the
  * EJBDoclet tags.
  *
  * @see Customer
  *
  * @ejb.bean
  *     name="bank/Account"
  *     type="CMP"
  *     jndi-name="ejb/bank/Account"
  *     local-jndi-name="ejb/bank/LocalAccount"
  *     primkey-field="id"
  *     schema = "Customers"
  *
  * @ejb.finder
  *     signature="java.util.Collection findAll()"
  *     unchecked="true"
  *
  * @ejb.finder signature="java.util.Collection findByName(java.lang.String name)" 
  *             unchecked="true"
  *             query= "SELECT OBJECT(o) FROM Customers AS o WHERE o.name
  *             LIKE ?1"
  *
  * @ejb.transaction
  *     type="Required"
  *
  * @ejb.interface
  *     remote-class="test.interfaces.Account"
  *
  * @ejb.value-object
  *     match="*"
  *
  * @version 1.5
  */
