= Join point =

In computer science, a join point is a point in the control flow of a program where the control flow can arrive via two different paths. In particular, it's a basic block that has more than one predecessor. In aspect-oriented programming a set of join points is called a pointcut. A join point is a specification of when, in the corresponding main program, the aspect code should be executed.

The join point is a point of execution in the base code where the advice specified in a corresponding pointcut is applied.

== See also ==
- AspectJ, an aspect-oriented extension for the Java programming language
