= Attribute-oriented programming =

Attribute-oriented programming (@OP) is a technique for embedding metadata, namely attributes, within program code.

== Attribute-oriented programming in various languages ==
=== C++ ===
C++ has support for attributes. C++11 added attributes, which can indicate extra information to the compiler. C++26 added annotations for reflection.

=== C# ===
The C# language has supported attributes from its very first release. These attributes was used to give run-time information and are not used by a preprocessor. Currently with source generators, attributes can be used to drive generation of additional code at compile-time.

=== Hack ===
The Hack programming language supports attributes. Attributes can be attached to various program entities, and information about those attributes can be retrieved at run-time via reflection.

=== Java ===
Java has support for annotations. With the inclusion of Metadata Facility for Java (JSR-175) into the J2SE 5.0 release it is possible to utilize attribute-oriented programming right out of the box. XDoclet library makes it possible to use attribute-oriented programming approach in earlier versions of Java.

In Java, annotations are used for code generation and reflection.

=== UML ===
The Unified Modeling Language (UML) supports a kind of attribute called stereotypes.

== Tools ==
- Annotation Processing Tool (apt)
- Spoon, an Annotation-Driven Java Program Transformer
- XDoclet, a Javadoc-Driven Program Generator
