= Layered system =

In telecommunications, a layered system is a system in which components are grouped, i.e., layered, in a hierarchical arrangement, such that lower layers provide functions and services that support the functions and services of higher layers.

Systems of ever-increasing complexity and capability can be built by adding or changing the layers to improve overall system capability while using the components that are still in place.

This article incorporates public domain material from Federal Standard 1037C. General Services Administration. Archived from the original on 2022-01-22.
