= Domain =

A domain is a geographic area controlled by a single person or organization. Domain may also refer to:

== Law and human geography ==
- Demesne, in English common law and other Medieval European contexts, lands directly managed by their holder rather than being delegated to subordinate managers
- Domaine, a large parcel of land under single ownership, which would historically generate income for its owner
- Eminent domain, the right of a government to appropriate another person's property for public use
- Private domain / Public domain, places defined under Jewish law where it is either permitted or forbidden to move objects on the Sabbath day
- Public domain, creative work to which no exclusive intellectual property rights apply
- Territory (subdivision), a non-sovereign geographic area which has come under the authority of another government

== Science ==
- Domain (taxonomy), a taxonomic subdivision larger than a kingdom
- Domain of discourse, the collection of entities of interest in logical analysis
- High-field domain (physics) in semiconductors, also called Böer domain
- Knowledge domain, knowledge within a certain discipline, often formalized as a terminology
- Magnetic domain (physics), a region within a magnetic material which has uniform magnetization
- Protein domain (biology), a part of a protein that can exist independently of the rest of the protein chain
- Social domain, a concept in sociology

== Mathematics ==
- Domain (mathematical analysis), an open connected set
- Domain (ring theory), a non-trivial ring without left or right nonzero zero divisors
  - Integral domain, a non-trivial commutative ring without nonzero zero divisors
    - Atomic domain, an integral domain in which every nonzero non-unit is a finite product of irreducible elements
    - Bézout domain, an integral domain in which the sum of two principal ideals is again a principal ideal
    - Euclidean domain, an integral domain which allows a suitable generalization of the Euclidean algorithm
    - Dedekind domain, an integral domain in which every nonzero proper ideal factors into a product of prime ideals
    - GCD domain, an integral domain in which every two non-zero elements have a greatest common divisor
    - Principal ideal domain, an integral domain in which every ideal is principal
    - Unique factorization domain, an integral domain in which every non-zero element can be written as a product of irreducible elements in essentially a unique way
- Domain of a function, the set of input values for which the (total) function is defined
  - Domain of definition of a partial function
  - Natural domain of a partial function
  - Domain of holomorphy of a function
- Domain of an algebraic structure, the set on which the algebraic structure is defined
- Domain of discourse, the set of entities over which logic variables may range
- Domain theory, the study of certain subsets of continuous lattices that provided the first denotational semantics of the lambda calculus
- Frequency domain, the analysis of mathematical functions with respect to frequency, rather than time
- Fundamental domain, subset of a space that contains exactly one point from each orbit of the action of a symmetry group
- Time domain, the analysis of mathematical functions with respect to time

== Information technology ==
- Administrative domain
- Attribute domain, the set of values allowed in an attribute
- Broadcast domain, in computer networking, a group of special-purpose addresses to receive network announcements
- Collision domain
- Domain (software engineering), a field of study that defines a set of common requirements, terminology, and functionality for any software program constructed to solve a problem in a given field
  - Application domain, a mechanism used within a Common Language Infrastructure to isolate executed software applications from one another
  - Programming domain, a set of programming languages or programming environments that were engineered specifically for a particular domain (software engineering)
- Network domain, a named grouping of hosts and servers with managed login, access to resources, and permissions
  - Domain name, a label that identifies a realm of administrative autonomy, authority, or control within the Internet

== Places ==
=== Australian public domains ===
- The Domain, Sydney, a large open space near the central business district of Sydney
- Kings Domain, Melbourne, Victoria
- Queens Domain, Hobart, Tasmania

=== New Zealand public domains ===
- Auckland Domain, a large inner-city park in Auckland
- One Tree Hill Domain in Auckland
- Mount Eden Domain in Auckland
- Mount Smart Domain in Auckland
- Mangere Domain in Mangere
- Hamilton Lake Domain in Hamilton
- Taumarunui Domain in Taumarunui
- Ashburton Domain in Canterbury
- Ocean Beach Domain in Dunedin

=== Other places ===
- The Domain (Austin, Texas), a shopping mall in Austin, Texas, US
- Domain (Hong Kong shopping centre), a shopping mall in Yau Tong, Kowloon, Hong Kong
- Domain, Manitoba, a hamlet in Manitoba, Canada
- Domain Precinct, a part of South Yarra in Melbourne, Victoria, Australia

== Entertainment ==
=== Film ===
- Domain (2009 film), a French film
- Domain (2016 film), an American film
- The Domain (film), a 2019 Portuguese film

=== Music ===
- "Domain", a track by John Carpenter from the album Lost Themes
- "Domain", a song by KSI from the 2020 album Dissimulation

=== Games ===
- Domain (game), an abstract strategy game first published in 1982

== Other uses ==
- Domain, or battlespace, a concept in military operations dividing operating environments into defined components
- Domain Group, an Australian real estate marketing portal, owner of the brand domain.com.au and others

== See also ==
- Dominion (disambiguation)
