= Television presenter =

Person who hosts a television program

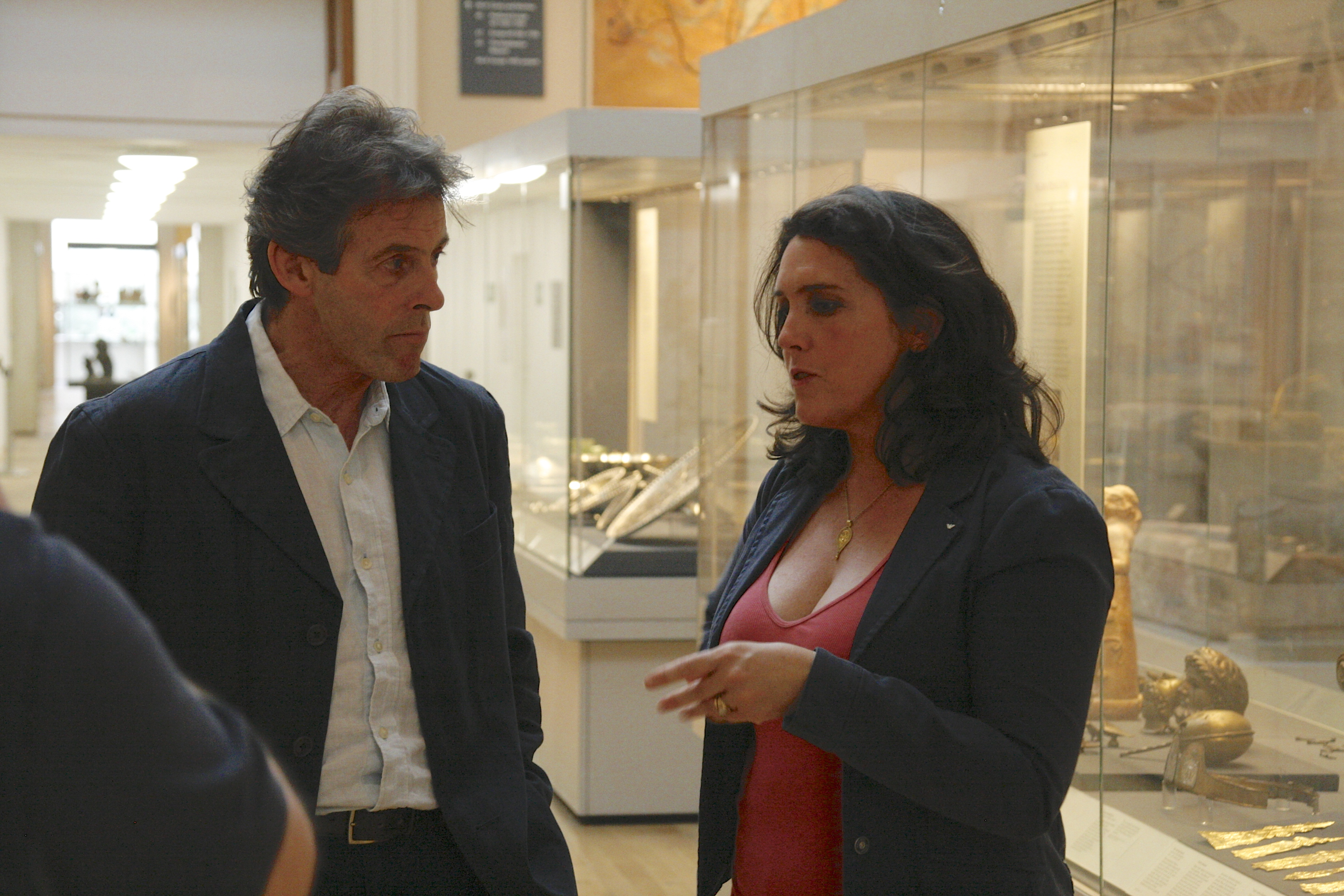
British presenter Bettany Hughes (right) and curator Ralph Jackson (left) converse during the shooting of ITV's program Britain's Secret Treasures.

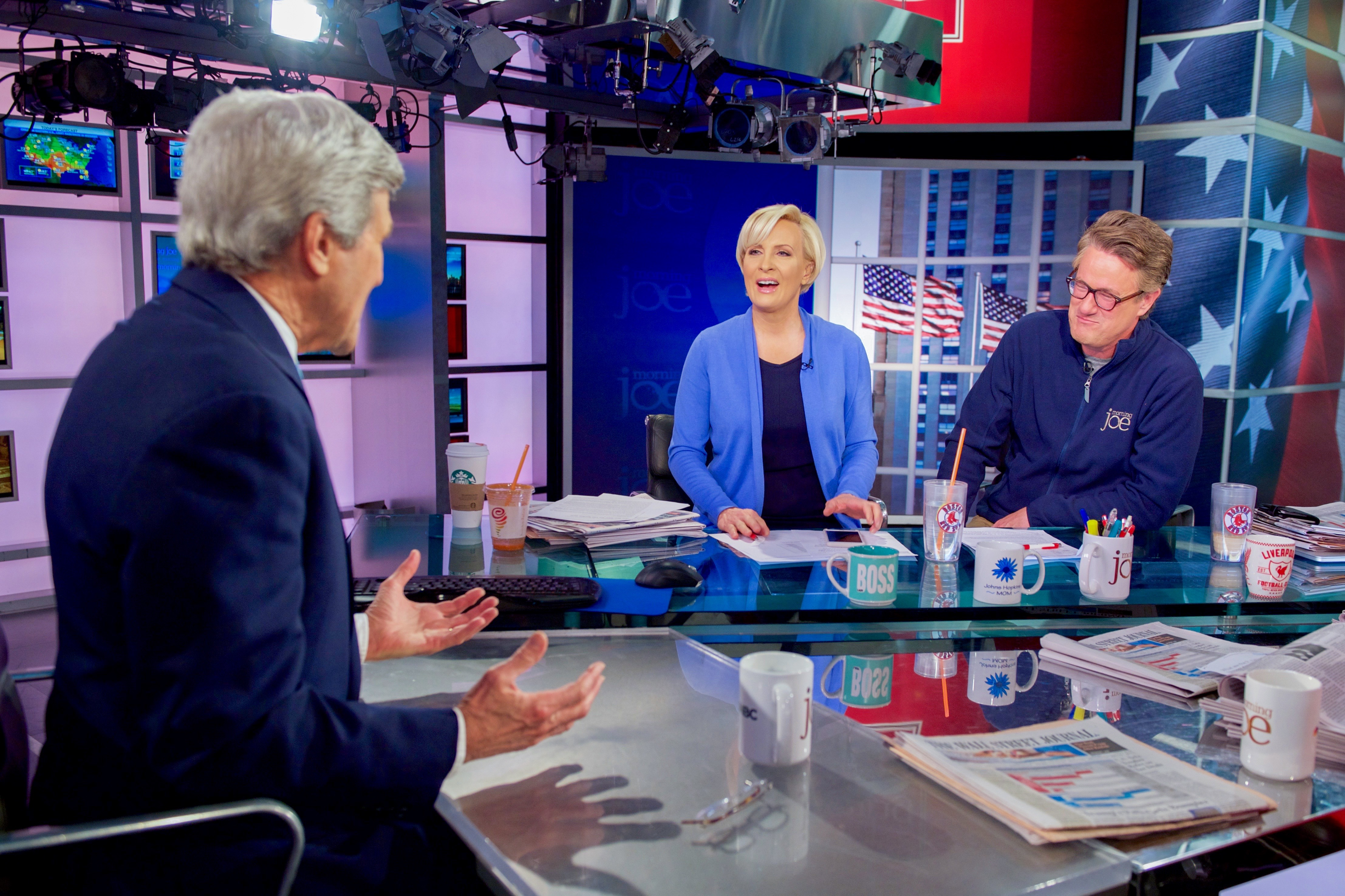
U.S. Secretary of State John Kerry (left) chats with Joe Scarborough and Mika Brzezinski (right), co-hosts of the MSNBC's program Morning Joe, before appearing on the program on April 5, 2015, in the NBC Studios in New York.

A television presenter (or television host, some become a "television personality") is a person who introduces or hosts television programs, often serving as a mediator for the program and the audience. It is common for people who garnered fame in other fields to take on this role, but some people have made their name solely within the field of presenting—such as children's television series or infomercials—to become television personalities.

== Roles ==
Often, presenters may double for being famed in other fields, such as an actor, model, comedian, musician, doctor, etc. Others may be subject-matter experts, such as scientists or politicians, serving as presenters for a programme about their field of expertise (for instance, David Attenborough). Some are celebrities who have made their name in one area, then leverage their fame to get involved in other areas.

Examples of this latter group include British comedian Michael Palin who now presents programmes about travel (such as Around the World in 80 Days), and American actor Alan Alda, who presented Scientific American Frontiers for over a decade. Another example would be American stand-up comedian Joe Rogan, who is a commentator and post-fight interviewer in UFC. The term is commonly used in many countries including Canada, New Zealand, The Netherlands, Liechtenstein, Barbados, Sri Lanka, India, Spain, Denmark, Greece, Australia, Egypt, Andorra, Malta, San Marino, Japan and South Korea.

== United States ==
In the US, such a person is typically called a host, such as in the terminology talk show host, or an MC (Master of ceremonies). In the context of TV news programs, they are known as anchors.

== See also ==
- News presenter
- Radio personality
- Horror host
- Pundit
- Sports commentator
- List of talk show hosts
