= James Lockyer =

James Lockyer may refer to:

- James Lockyer (activist), Canadian lawyer and social justice activist
- James Lockyer (architect), English architect and surveyor
- James E. Lockyer, Canadian lawyer, law professor, and politician
- James Lockyer (musician), British violist
