= Adaptive collaborative control =

Decision-making approach

Adaptive collaborative control is a decision-making approach that enables humans and robots to work together as partners rather than in traditional master-slave relationships. Unlike conventional robotic systems where humans directly control every action, adaptive collaborative control allows autonomous agents (robots) and human operators to collaborate as peers, sharing decision-making responsibilities to accomplish common goals.

This methodology is implemented through hybrid computational models that combine finite-state machines with functional models as subcomponents. These models simulate the behavior of multi-agent systems where both human and robotic participants contribute to task execution and work product development. The approach represents a fundamental shift from traditional control theory applications in teleoperation, moving away from the paradigm of "humans as controllers/robots as tools" toward genuine human-robot collaboration.

The concept of "collaborative control" was first developed in the late 1990s and early 2000s by Fong, Thorpe, and Baur (1999). According to Fong et al., robots operating under collaborative control must possess three essential characteristics: they must be self-reliant (capable of independent operation), aware (able to perceive and understand their environment and situation), and adaptive (able to modify their behavior based on changing conditions). The "adaptive" qualifier, while not always explicitly stated in literature, is considered fundamental to the official definition of collaborative control.

Early implementations focused primarily on vehicle teleoperation, where the approach demonstrated its potential to enhance remote control operations. Modern applications have expanded significantly to include training systems, analytical tools, and engineering applications across various domains: teleoperations involving humans and multiple robots, multi-robot collaborative systems, unmanned vehicle control, and fault-tolerant controller design.

== Operational framework ==
Like traditional control methodologies, adaptive collaborative control processes system inputs and regulates outputs according to predefined rules. However, it differs fundamentally in how these rules are applied. The constraints operate primarily at the strategic level, governing high-level goals and tasks as defined by human operators. Lower-level tactical decisions remain adaptive and flexible, accommodating varying degrees of autonomy, interaction patterns, and capabilities of different agents (both human and robotic).

When uncertainty arises in task execution that could impact the overarching strategy, models operating under this methodology can query external sources for guidance. This interaction may generate alternative courses of action if they provide greater certainty in supporting the strategic objectives. If no suitable alternative emerges or if there is no response from queried sources, the model continues with its original planned actions.

== Implementation considerations ==
Several critical factors must be addressed when implementing adaptive collaborative control in simulation environments. The fundamental requirement for data fusion arises from the need to integrate information from multiple collaborating agents. This often necessitates establishing prioritization schemes to manage continuous streams of recommendations and data inputs.

The degree of autonomy granted to robotic agents in human–robot interaction scenarios and the appropriate weighting of decisional authority in robot-robot interactions are crucial architectural considerations. Interface design represents a vital human systems integration challenge, as varied human interpretational frameworks require careful attention to ensure that robots accurately convey their intentions and status when interacting with human partners.

== History ==
The history of adaptive collaborative control began in 1999 through the efforts of Terrence Fong and Charles Thorpe of Carnegie Mellon University and Charles Baur of École Polytechnique Fédérale de Lausanne. Fong et al. believed existing telerobotic practices, which centered on a human point of view, while sufficient for some domains were sub-optimal for operating multiple vehicles or controlling planetary rovers. The new approach devised by Fong et al. focused on a robot-centric teleoperation model that treated the human as a peer and made requests to them in the manner a person would seek advice from experts.

In the nominal work, Fong et al. implemented collaborative control design using a PioneerAT mobile robot and a UNIX workstation with wireless communications and distributed message-based computing. Two years later, Fong utilized collaborative control for several more applications, including the collaboration of a single human operator with multiple mobile robots for surveillance and reconnaissance. Around this same time, Goldberg and Chen presented an adaptive collaborative control system that possessed malfunctioning sources. The control design proved to create a model that maintained a robust performance when subjected to a sizeable fraction of malfunctioning sources. In the work, Goldberg and Chen expanded on the definition of collaborative control to include multiple sensors and multiple control processes in addition to human operators as sources. A collaborative, cognitive workspace in the form of a three-dimensional representation developed by Idaho National Laboratory to support understanding of tasks and environments for human operators expounds on Fong's seminal work which used textual dialogue as the human-robot interaction.

The success of the 3-D display provided evidence of the use of mental models for increased team success. During that same time, Fong et al. developed a three dimensional display that was formed via a fusion of sensor data. A recent adaptation of adaptive collaborative control in 2010 was used to design a fault tolerant control system using a Lyapunov function based analysis.

== Initialization ==
The simuland for adaptive collaborative control centers on robotics. As such, adaptive collaborative control follows the tenets of control theory applied to robotics at its basest level. That means the states of the robot are observed at a given instant and noted if it is within some accepted bound. If it is not, the estimated states of the robot are calculated using equations of dynamics and kinematics at some future time. The process of entering observation data into the model to generate initial conditions is called initialization. The process of initialization for adaptive collaborative control occurs differently depending on the environment: robotics only and human-robotic interaction. Under a robotics only environment, initialization occurs very similarly to the description above. The robotics, systems, subsystems, non-human entities observe some state it finds not in accordance with the higher-level strategy. The entities that are aware of this error use the appropriate equations to present a revised value for a future time step to its peers. For human-robotic interactions, initialization can occur at two different levels. The first level is what was previously described. In this instance, the robot notices some anomaly in its states that is not wholly consistent or is problematic with its higher-level strategy. It queries the human seeking advice to regulate its dilemma. In the other case, the human feels cause to either query some aspect of the robot's state (e.g. health, trajectory, speed) or present advice to the robot that is challenged against the robot's existing tactical approach to the higher-level strategy. The main inputs for adaptive collaborative control are a human-initiated dialogue based command or value presented by either a human or robotic element. The inputs used in the system models serve as the starting point for the collaboration.

A number of ways are available to gather observational data for use in functional models. The easiest method to gather observational data is simple human observation of the robotic system. Self-monitoring attributes such as built-in test (BIT) can provide regular reports on important system characteristics. A common approach to gather observations is to employ sensors throughout the robotic system. Vehicles operating in teleoperations have speedometers to indicate how fast they travel. Robotic systems with either stochastic or cyclic motion often employ accelerometers to note the forces exerted. GPS sensors provide a standardized data type that is used nearly universally for depicting location. Multi-sensor systems have been used to gather heterogeneous observational data for applications in path planning.

== Computation ==
Adaptive collaborative control is most accurately modeled as a closed loop feedback control system. Closed loop feedback control describes the event where the outputs of a system from an input are used to influence the present or future behavior of the system. The feedback control model is governed by a set of equations that are used to predict the future state of the simuland and regulate its behavior. These equations – in conjunction with principles of control theory – are used to evolve physical operations of the simuland to include, but not limited to: dialogue, path planning, motion, monitoring, and lifting objects over time. Many times, these equations are modeled as nonlinear partial differential equations over a continuous time domain.

Due to their complexity, powerful computers are necessary to implement these models. A consequence of using computers to simulate these models is that continuous systems cannot be fully calculated. Instead, numerical solutions, such as the Runge–Kutta methods, are utilized to approximate these continuous models.

These equations are initialized from the response of one or more sources and rates of changes and outputs are calculated. These rates of changes predict the states of the simuland a short time in the future. The time increment for this prediction is called a time step. These new states are applied to the model to determine the new rates of changes and observational data. This behavior is continued until the desired number of iterations is completed. In the event a future state violates or comes within a tolerance of the violation the simuland will confer with its human counterpart seeking advice on how to proceed from that point. The outputs, or observational data, are used by the human operators to determine what they believe is the best course of action for the simuland. Their commands are fed with the input into the control system and assessed regarding its effectiveness in resolving the issues. If the human commands are determined to be valuable, the simuland will adjust its control input to what the human suggested. If the human's commands are determined to be unbeneficial, malicious, or non-existent, the model will seek its own correction approach.

== Domain and Codomain ==
The domain for the models used to conduct adaptive collaborative control is commands, queries, and responses from the human operator at the finite-state machine level. Commands from the human operator allow the agent to be provided with additional input in its decision-making process. This information is particularly beneficial when the human is a subject matter expert or the human is aware of how to reach an overarching goal when the agent is focused on only one aspect of the entire problem. Queries from the human are used to gather status information on either support functions of the agent or to determine progress on missions. Many times the robot's response serves as precursor information for issuance of a command as human assistance to the agent. Responses from the human operator are initiated by queries from the agent and feedback into the system to provide additional input to potentially regulate an action or set of actions from the agent. At the functional model level, the system has translated all accepted commands from the human into control inputs used to carry out tasks defined to the agent. Due to the autonomous nature of the simuland, input from the agent is being fed into the machine to operate sustaining functions and tasking that the human operator has ignored or answered to an insufficient manner.

The codomain for the models that utilize adaptive collaborative control are queries, information statements, and responses from the agent. Queries and information statements are elements of the dialogue exchange at the finite-state machine level. Queries from the agent are the system's way of soliciting a response from a human operator. This is particularly important when the agent is physically stuck or at a logical impasse. The types of queries the agent can ask must be pre-defined by the modeler. The frequency and detail associated with a particular query depends on the expertise of the human operator or more accurately the expertise of the human operator identified to the agent. When the agent responds it will send an information statement to the human operator. This statement provides a brief description on what the adaptive collaborative control system decided. At the functional model level, the action associated with the information statement is carried out.

== Applications ==
=== Vehicle teleoperation ===
Vehicle teleoperation has been around for many years. Early adaptations of vehicle teleoperations were robotic vehicles that were controlled continuously by human operators. Many of these systems were operated with line-of-sight RF communications and are now regarded as toys for children. Recent developments in the area of unmanned systems have brought a measure of autonomy to the robots. Adaptive collaborative control offers a shared mode of control where robotic vehicles and humans exchange ideas and advice regarding the best decisions to make on a route following and obstacle avoidance. This shared mode of operation mitigates problems of humans remotely operating in hazardous environments with poor communications and limited performance when humans have continuous, direct control. For vehicle teleoperations, robots will query humans to receive input on decisions that affect their tasks or when presented with safety-related issues. This dialogue is presented through an interface module that also allows the human operation to view the impact of the dialogue. In addition, this interface module allows the human operator to view what the robot's sensors capture in order to initiate commands or inquiries as necessary.

=== Fault Tolerant System ===
In practice, there are cases where multiple subsystems work together to achieve a common goal. This is a fairly common practice for reliability engineering. This technique involves systems working together collaboratively and the reliable operation of the overarching system is an important issue. Fault tolerant strategies are combined with the subsystems to form a fault tolerant collaborative system. A direct application is the case where two robotic manipulators work together to grasp a common object. For these systems, it is important that when one subsystem becomes faulty, the healthy subsystem reconfigures itself to operate alone to ensure the whole system can still perform its operations until the other subsystem is repaired. In this case, the subsystems create a dialogue between themselves to determine one another's status. In the event of one system starting to exhibit numerous or dangerous faults the secondary subsystem takes over the operation until the faulty system can be repaired.

== Levels of Autonomy ==
Four levels of autonomy have been devised to serve as a baseline for human-robot interactions that included adaptive collaborative control. The four levels, ranging from full manual to fully autonomous, are: tele mode, safe mode, shared mode, and autonomous mode. Adaptive collaborative controllers typically range from shared mode to autonomous mode. The two modes of interest are:

- Shared mode – robots can relieve the operator of the burden of direct control, using reactive navigation to find a path based on their perception of the environment. Shared mode provides for a dynamic allocation of roles and responsibilities. The robot accepts varying degrees of operator intervention and supports dialogue through the use of a finite number of scripted suggestions (e.g. “Path blocked! Continue left or right?”) and other text messages that appear within the graphical user interface.
- Autonomous mode – robots self-regulate high-level tasks such as patrol, search region or follow path. In this mode, the only user intervention occurs at the tasking level, i.e. the robot manages all decision-making and navigation.

== Limitations ==
Like many other control strategies, adaptive collaborative control has limits to its capabilities. Although the adaptive collaborative control allows for many tasks to be automated and other predefined cases to query the human operator, unstructured decision making remains the domain of humans, especially when common sense is required. Particularly, robots possess poor judgment at high-level perceptual functions, including object recognition and situation assessment.

A high number of tasks or a particular task that is very involved may create many questions, thereby increasing the complexity of the dialogue. This complexity to the dialogue in turn adds complexity to the system design.

To retain its adaptive nature, the flow of control and information through the simuland will vary with time and events. This dynamic makes debugging, verification, and validation difficult because it is harder to precisely identify an error condition or duplicate a failure situation. This becomes particularly problematic if the system must operate in a regulated facility, such as a nuclear power plant or waste water facility.

Issues that affect human-based teams also encumber adaptive collaborative controlled systems. In both cases, teams are required to coordinate activities, exchange information, communicate effectively, and minimize the potential for interference. Other factors that affect teams include resource distribution, timing, sequencing, progress monitoring, and procedure maintenance. Collaboration involves that all partners exhibit trust in the other collaborators and understand the other. To do so, each collaborator needs to have an accurate idea of what the other is capable of doing and how they will carry out an assignment. In some cases, the agent may have to weigh the responses from a human and the human must believe in the decisions a robot makes.
