= Dominion (disambiguation) =

A dominion was a self-governing autonomous state within the British Empire.

Dominion may also refer to:

== Businesses and brands ==
- Dominion (supermarket), in Canada
- Dominion Diamond Mines, in Canada
- Dominion Energy or Dominion, a utility in Virginia
- Dominion Enterprises, a creator and distributor of free periodicals
- Dominion Network, a Canadian radio network
- Dominion Stores (Newfoundland), a supermarket chain in Canada
- Dominion Theatre, in London, England
- Dominion Voting Systems, a Canadian-American company that sells electronic voting systems
- Dominion of Canada General Insurance Company (The Dominion), a defunct insurance company in Canada
- The Dominion Bank, a defunct bank in Canada

== Entertainment ==
=== Film ===
- Jurassic World Dominion, a 2022 science fiction film
- Dominion (documentary), a 2018 documentary about animal agriculture and animal rights
- Dominion (2016 film), a biographical film about poet Dylan Thomas
- Dominion: Prequel to the Exorcist, a 2005 horror film

=== Music ===
- Dominion (British band), a British band from Thornhill, Dewsbury
- Dominion (Filipino band), a Goth rock band
- "Dominion" (song), a 1987 song by the Sisters of Mercy
- Dominion (Benedictum album), 2011
- Dominion (HammerFall album), 2019
- Dominion (Jakob EP), 2004
- Dominion (Kamelot album), 1997
- Dominion (Don McLean album), 1982
- Dominion (Tech N9ne album), 2017
- Dominion (Skillet album), 2022
- Dominion (War of Ages album), 2023
- Dominion (Transformation Worship album), 2024

=== Games ===
- Dominion (card game), a card game by Donald X. Vaccarino
- Dominion: Storm Over Gift 3, a 1998 real-time strategy computer game

=== Print media ===
- "The Dominion" (Brunton Stephens poem), 1877 poem by J. Brunton Stephens
- Dominion (poem), a 1938 poem by A. R. D. Fairburn
- Dominion (Sansom novel), a 2012 alternative history novel by C. J. Sansom
- Dominion (Walters novel), a 1999 Doctor Who novel by Nick Walters
- Dominion: The Power of Man, the Suffering of Animals, and the Call to Mercy, a book about animal protection by Matthew Scully
- Dominators (DC Comics), an alien race collectively known as the Dominion in DC Comics
- Dominion (manga), a 1985–1986 manga by Masamune Shirow
- The Dominion (Canada), a monthly newspaper based in Montreal, Canada
- The Dominion (Wellington), a former newspaper in Wellington, New Zealand, now part of The Dominion Post
- Dominion: An Anthology of Speculative Fiction From Africa and the African Diaspora, 2020 American science fiction anthology
- Dominion (Tom Holland book), 2019 non-fiction book

=== Television ===
- "Dominion" (Stargate SG-1), a 2007 episode of Stargate SG-1 from season 10
- Dominion (Star Trek), an interstellar empire in the Star Trek fictional universe
- Dominion (TV series), a 2014 TV series on the Syfy channel, based on the 2010 movie Legion
- "Dominion" (Star Trek: Picard), an episode of the third season of Star Trek: Picard
- "Dominion", an episode from the second season of New Captain Scarlet
- "Dominion", an episode from Smallville season 10
- "Dominion", episode three of the History Channel documentary The Roman Invasion of Britain

== Places ==
- The Dominion, an archaic title for Canada
- Dominion, Nova Scotia, Canada
- Dominion, Maryland, an unincorporated community in Queen Anne's County, Maryland, United States
- The Dominion (San Antonio), a neighborhood in San Antonio, Texas, United States

== Other uses ==
- Dominion (angel), a type of angel
- Dominion (harness race), a race held at the Addington Raceway, Christchurch, New Zealand
- Dominion Institute, a former foundation promoting knowledge of Canadian heritage, now part of Historica Canada
- Dominion (political theory), the exercise of authority, possession, and/or domination
- HMS Dominion, a battleship in the British Royal Navy from 1905 to 1918
- NJPW Dominion, a professional wrestling event
- LNER Class A4 4489 Dominion of Canada, a steam locomotive
- The Dominion (train), a transcontinental passenger train on the Canadian Pacific Railway
- Dominion Robert Glass (1895–1968) African-American educator and academic administrator
- Dominion Road, Auckland, New Zealand

== See also ==
- Commonwealth realm, contemporary term for former Dominions
- Dominionism, a certain kind of conservative Christian political activity
- Dominions of Sweden
- Dominium, the Latin term from which Dominion derives
- Dominium mundi, medieval political theory of imperial domination
