= The Hemlock Cup =

2010 book by Bettany Hughes

- First edition (UK)
- Author: Bettany Hughes
- Subject: Biography, Greek history
- Published: 2010 (Jonathan Cape)
- Pages: 528

External videos
- The author lectures on the book's preparation and themes at the University of Oxford, October 2013

The Hemlock Cup: Socrates, Athens, and the Search for the Good Life is a 2010 popular history book on the life of Socrates written by Bettany Hughes and published by Jonathan Cape.
