= HM Prison Bullwood Hall =

Former women's prison in Essex, England

Coordinates: 51°35′38″N 0°37′59″E

HMP Bullwood Hall
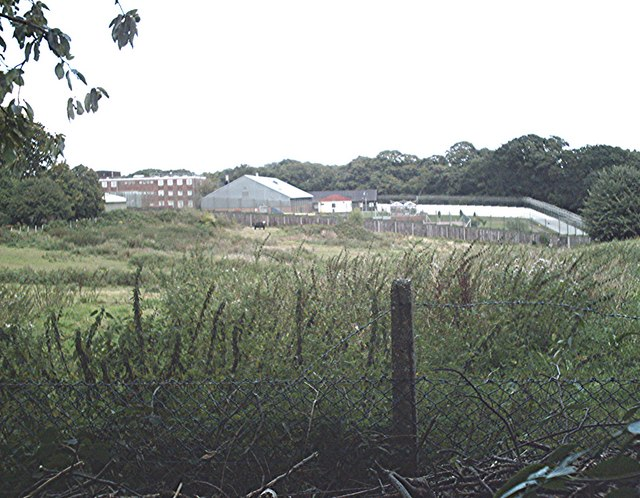
- HMP Bullwood Hall viewed from the west
- Interactive map of HMP Bullwood Hall
- Location: Hockley, Essex
- Security class: Adult Female/Young Offender
- Population: 248 (December 2012)
- Opened: 1962
- Closed: 2013
- Managed by: HM Prison Services
- Website: Bullwood Hall at justice.gov.uk

HM Prison Bullwood Hall is a former Category C women's prison and Young Offenders Institution, located in Hockley, Essex, England. The prison was operated by His Majesty's Prison Service.

== History ==
In 1955 the Prison Commissioners purchased Bullwood Hall, Hockley, for construction of a Borstal. The cost to build, in 1959, was expected to be £290,000.

Bullwood Hall opened as a female Borstal for 75 inmates in May 1962, the first Governor was Miss Joan Martyn, aged 62, formerly Governor at Cardiff Borstal.

Over time the prison also began to hold female adult prisoners.

In 2002 Bullwood Hall was featured in a series of six 30 minute documentaries titled "The Real Bad Girls". Although the series portrayed the prison in a positive light, a 2005 report condemned Bullwood Hall for still using the practice of slopping out. A year later the prison was singled out for its high levels of attempted suicides and self-harm amongst inmates.

Bullwood Hall continued to serve as a women's prison until 2006, when it was announced that it was to be converted into a Category C male prison, due to a shortage of male prison places.

On 10 January 2013 it was announced by the government that Bullwood Hall would be one of seven British prisons to be closed. The prison closed on Thursday 28 March 2013. In November 2015 outline planning proposals were submitted to redevelop the site for residential use, including 60 homes.

== Notable former inmates ==
- Tracie Andrews
- Sharon Carr – Britain's youngest female murderer
- Sally Clark
- Mary Druhan
- Lisa and Michelle Taylor
- Sara Thornton
