= Caparison =

Cloth covering laid over a horse or other animal for protection and decoration

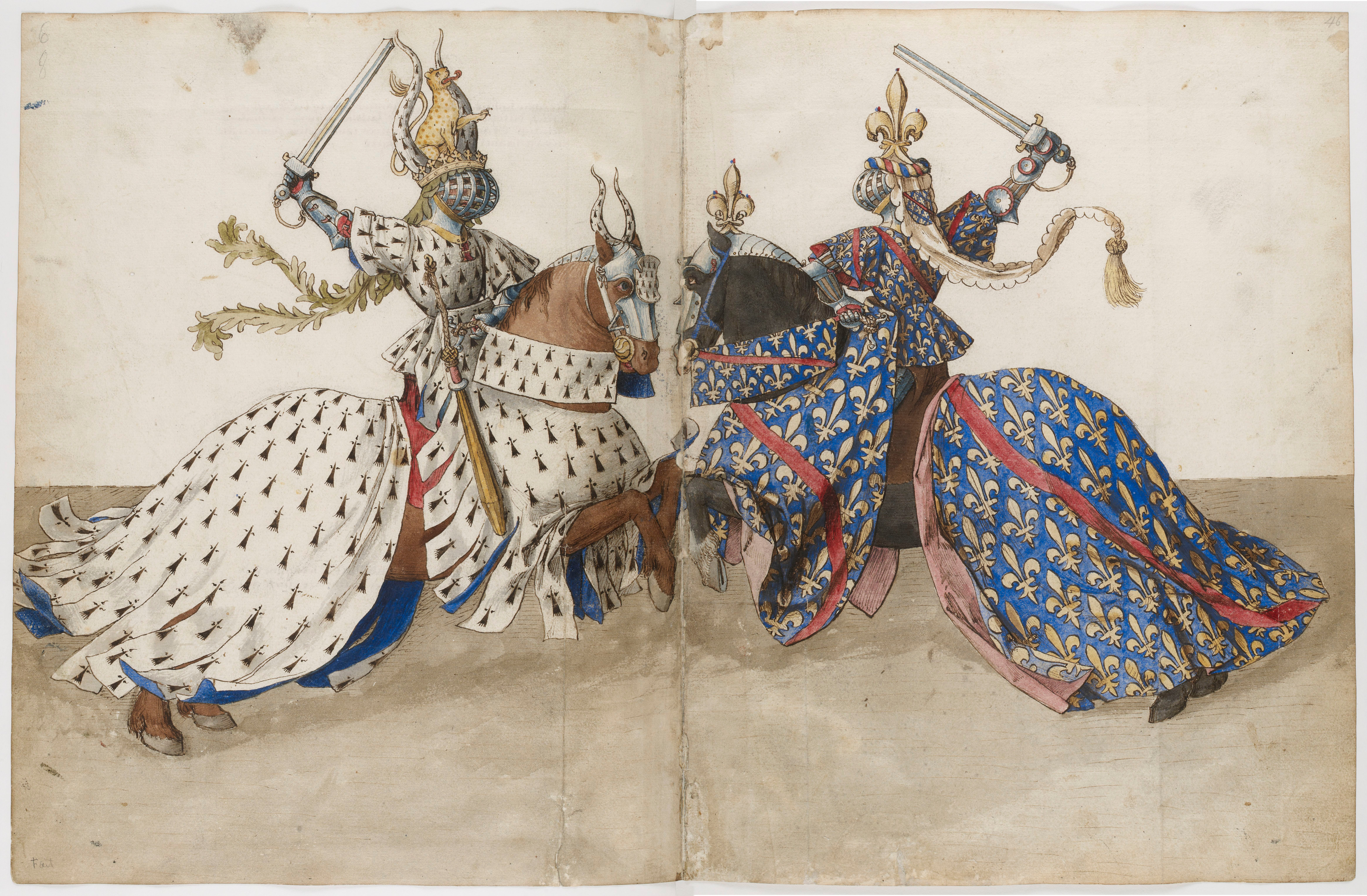
The Dukes of Brittany (left) and Bourbon on caparisoned horses at a tournament fight (1460s), from Le Livre des tournois by Barthélemy d'Eyck

A caparison is a cloth covering laid over a horse or other animal for protection and decoration. In modern times, they are used mainly in parades and for historical reenactments. A similar term is horse-trapper. The word is borrowed from French, and ultimately derives from the Medieval Latin caparo, meaning a cape.

== History ==
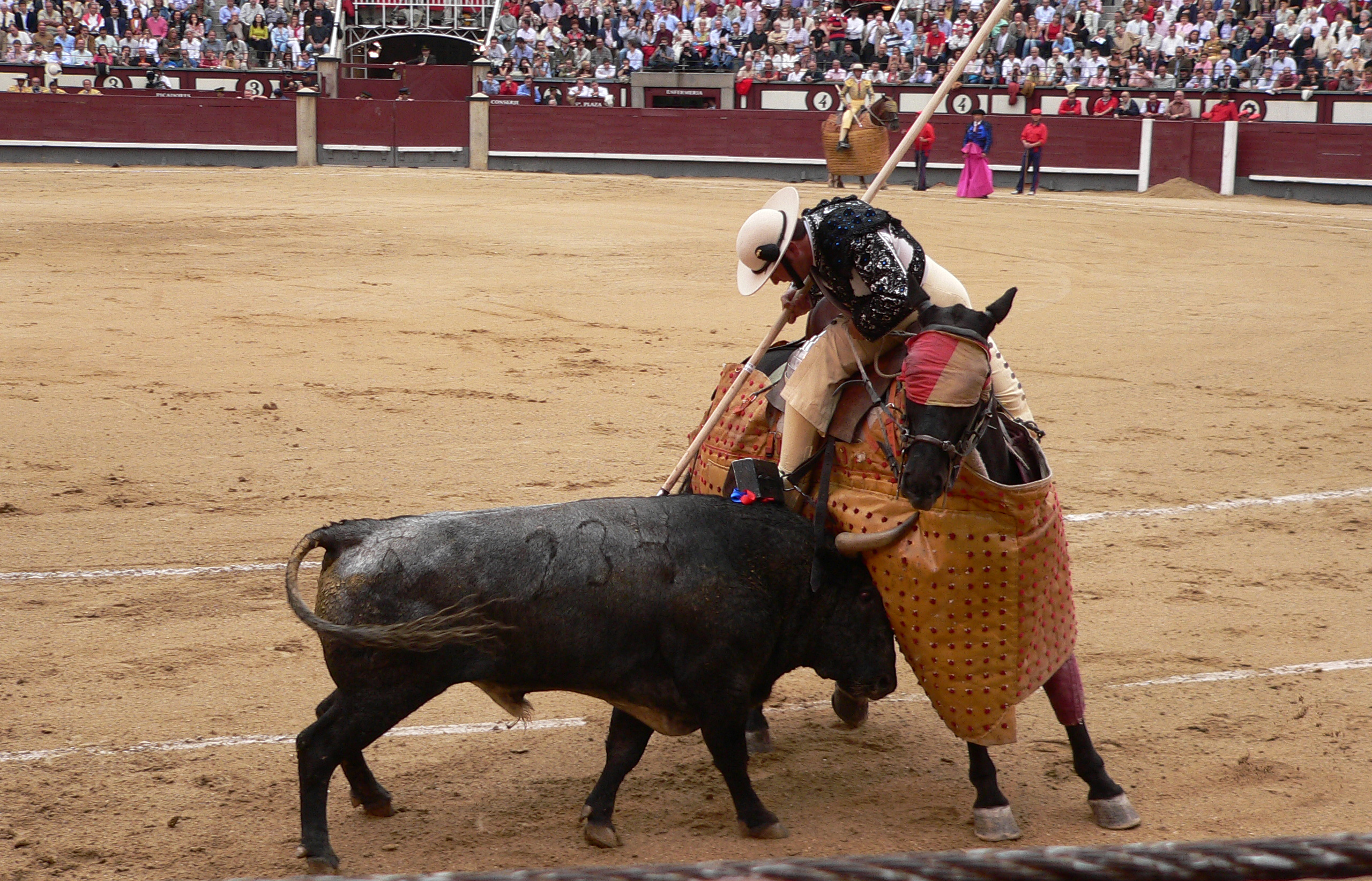
Picador on a caparisoned horse at a bullfight

In antiquity, a "magnificently caparisoned horse" takes a central place in a vision reported in the deutero-canonical text, 2 Maccabees 3:25, which prevents the Seleucid emissary Heliodorus from a planned assault on the Jewish temple treasury in Jerusalem.

In the Middle Ages, caparisons were part of the horse armour known as barding, which was worn during battle and tournaments. They were adopted in the twelfth century in response to conditions of campaigning in the Crusades, where local armies employed archers, both on foot and horse, in large quantities. The covering might not completely protect the horse against the arrows but it could deflect and lessen their damage.

An early depiction of a knight's horse wearing a caparison may be seen on the small Carlton-in-Lindrick knight figurine from the late 12th century. Modern re-enactment tests have shown that a loose caparison protects the horse reasonably well against arrows, especially if combined with a gambeson-like undercloth underneath. Medieval caparisons were frequently embroidered with the coat of arms of the horse's rider.

In 1507, a horse disguised as a unicorn at the tournament of the Wild Knight and the Black Lady in Edinburgh had a caparison of black and white damask lined with canvas. Mary, Queen of Scots, gave Lord Darnley a caparison made of gold and silver cloth in September 1566. A caparison made of red taffeta for the horse of James VI of Scotland in June 1591 may have been intended for a masque performed at Tullibardine Castle. Velvet caparisons lined with buckram were made for Henrietta Maria and her gentlewomen in 1630s.

== Domesticated and temple elephants of India ==
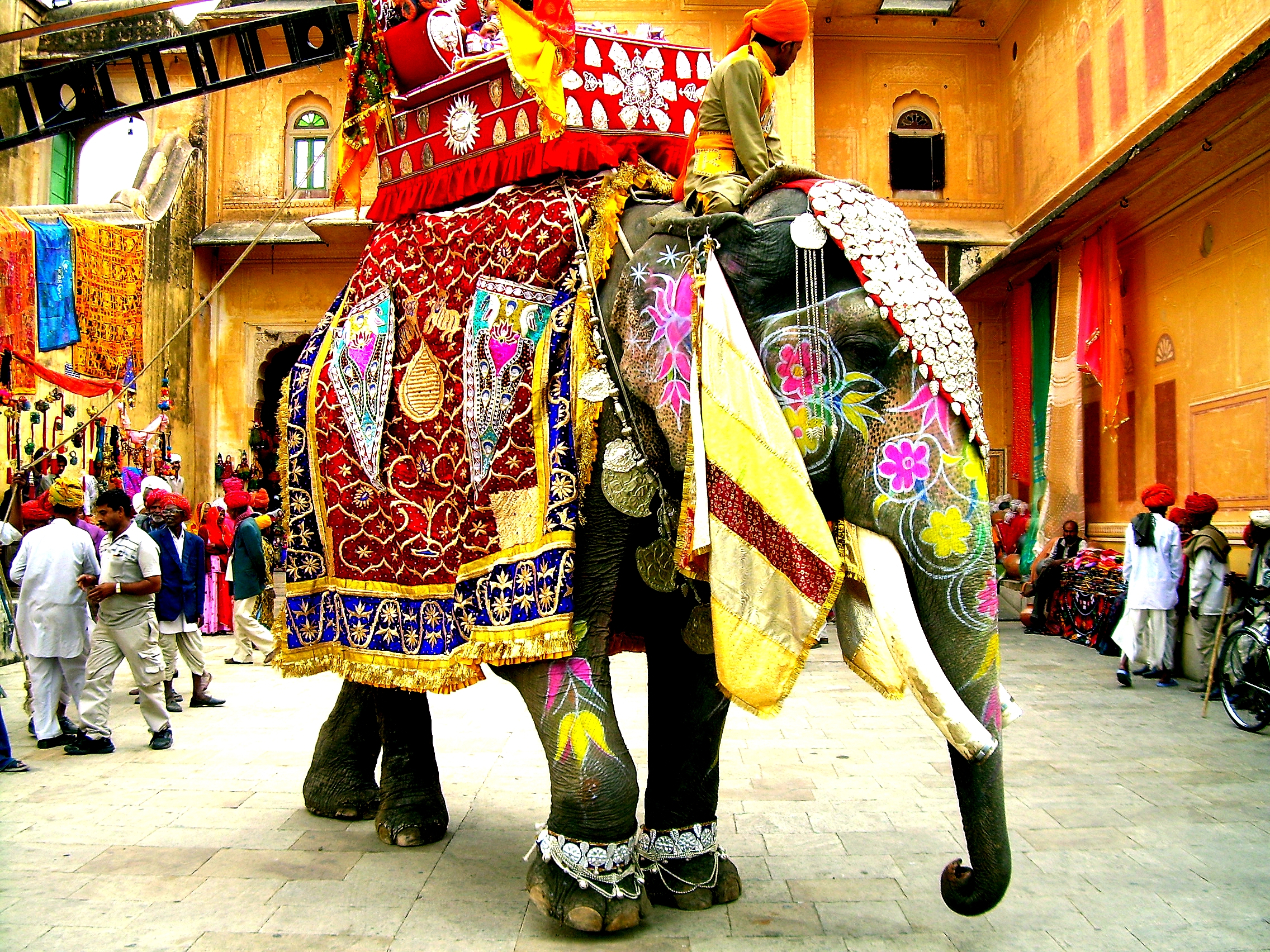
A decorated Indian elephant carrying a howdah during a fair in Jaipur, India

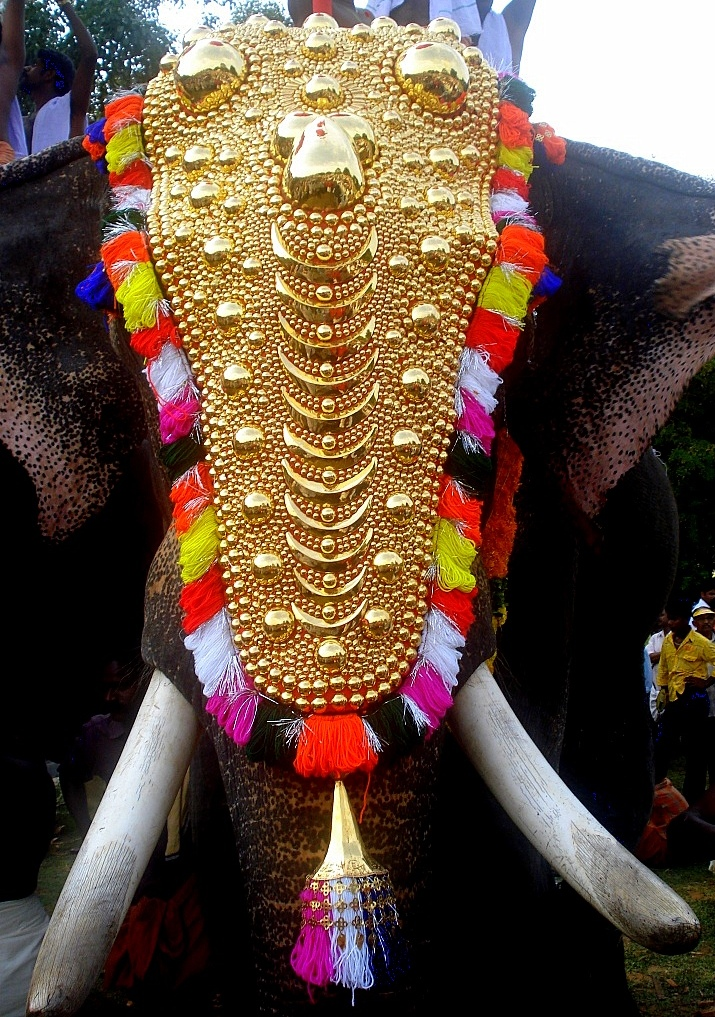
Nettipattam on a Caparison elephant

In the Indian state of Kerala, elephants are decorated during temple festivals. They wear a distinctive golden head covering called a nettipattam, which is often translated into English as an elephant caparison. However, it covers only the head, not the body, as in a horse caparison.

== See also ==
- Horses in the Middle Ages
- Barding
- Horses in warfare
- Temple elephant
- War elephant
- Horse blanket
