= West Yorkshire Hoard =

Anglo-Saxon gold hoard

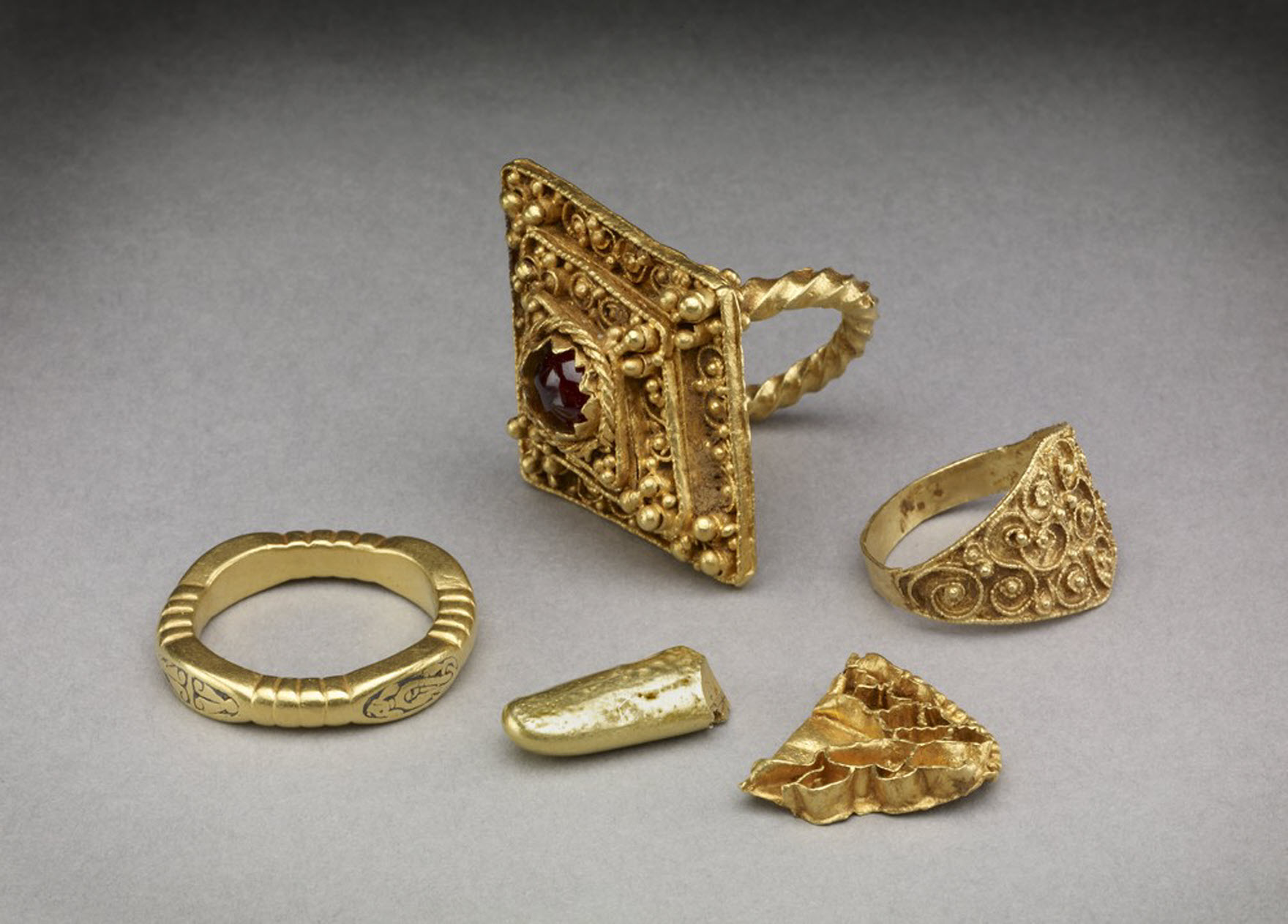
- 2008 finds from West Yorkshire hoard
- Material: Gold; Lead
- Period/culture: Medieval
- Discovered: 2008–09; East of Leeds
- Present location: Leeds Story Gallery, Leeds City Museum
- Identification: SWYOR-F86A02; SWYOR-3B5652

The West Yorkshire Hoard is a precious-metal hoard of six gold objects, including four gold finger-rings, and a lead spindle whorl, which was discovered near Leeds, West Yorkshire, in 2008–2009 by a metal detectorist. The find was of national and international significance, expanding the understanding of hoards and hoarding in the north of England in early medieval England, as well as expanding the corpus of known gold rings from the period.

== Discovery ==
The hoard was discovered in a series of separate searches by Frank Andrusyk, a detectorist during 2008–09. After Andrusyk discovered the initial group of four rings and a fragment of a gold brooch, he informed the Portable Antiquities Scheme who then surveyed the field. Six months later in 2009, further down the slope, another gold ring and a lead spindle whorl were found.

== Contents ==
The hoard contains four gold finger-rings, a fragment of gold cloisonné jewellery, a piece of gold ingot, along with a lead spindle whorl. The 2008 finds were found in three batches across two days and were a finger-ring set with a garnet, a finger-ring with an enlarged bezel, a finger-ring inlaid with niello, a partial gold ingot and a fragment of cloisonné. The 2009 finds were a gold finger-ring with a round bezel, filigree and granulated decoration, as well as a lead disc, most likely a spindle whorl.

=== Finger-rings ===
==== Ring 1: Lozenge-shaped finger-ring set with a cabochon garnet ====
Reverse of rings, 2008

This ring is formed by a large lozenge, which has two smaller lozenges stepped on top of it, the uppermost lozenge is set with a naturally-flawed oval garnet in a dog-tooth setting which is in turn framed by twisted gold wire. Gold pellets decorate the angles of the lozenges and further gold detailing in filigree and pellets decorates the spacing. The hoop is in a rare style and is made of twisted rod with scrolled ends which are attached to the back of the bezel. The decoration is very crisp and the ring does not appear to have been worn to any great extent. Based on the use of serrated filigree, the ring was made in the 10th or early 11th-century.

==== Ring 2: Finger-ring with enlarged bezel ====
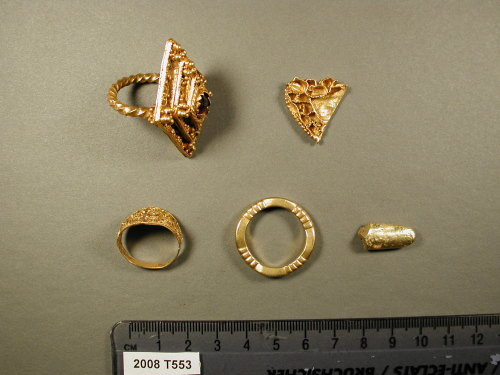
2008 finds

This ring is the smallest of the rings from the hoard and is made from a flattened gold band, which is enlarged into a bezel. The ring shows signs of wear and is not at the same level of craftsmanship as either Rings 1 or 3. It is decorated with upright serrated filigree decoration, of a type which dates from the mid-ninth to the tenth centuries.

==== Ring 3: Finger-ring with round bezel ====
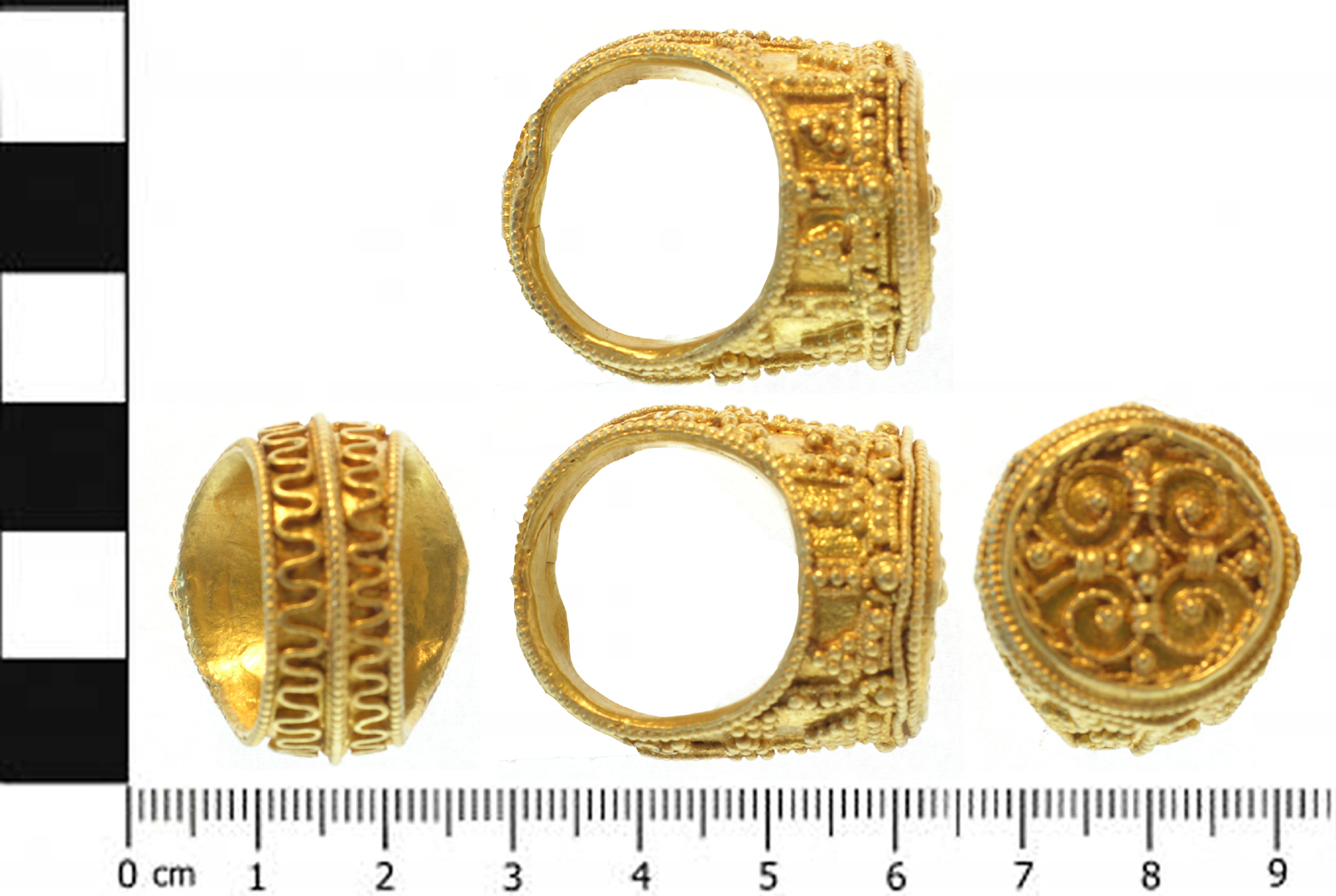
Views of the round bezel ring, 2009

This large gold ring has a round bezel set on top of a hollow, box-like construction and is covered with complex decoration made of gold granulation and filigree. It has been suggested that the filigree decoration might represent a vine, a popular motif in religious imagery. The hollow construction when moved appears to have an object inside the hermetically sealed chamber; x-ray examination shows that the object may be organic, and one interpretation is that this ring was used to hold a relic. There are a small number of similar rings which mean that its production may date to the ninth, tenth or eleventh centuries.

==== Ring 4: Finger-ring with niello panels ====
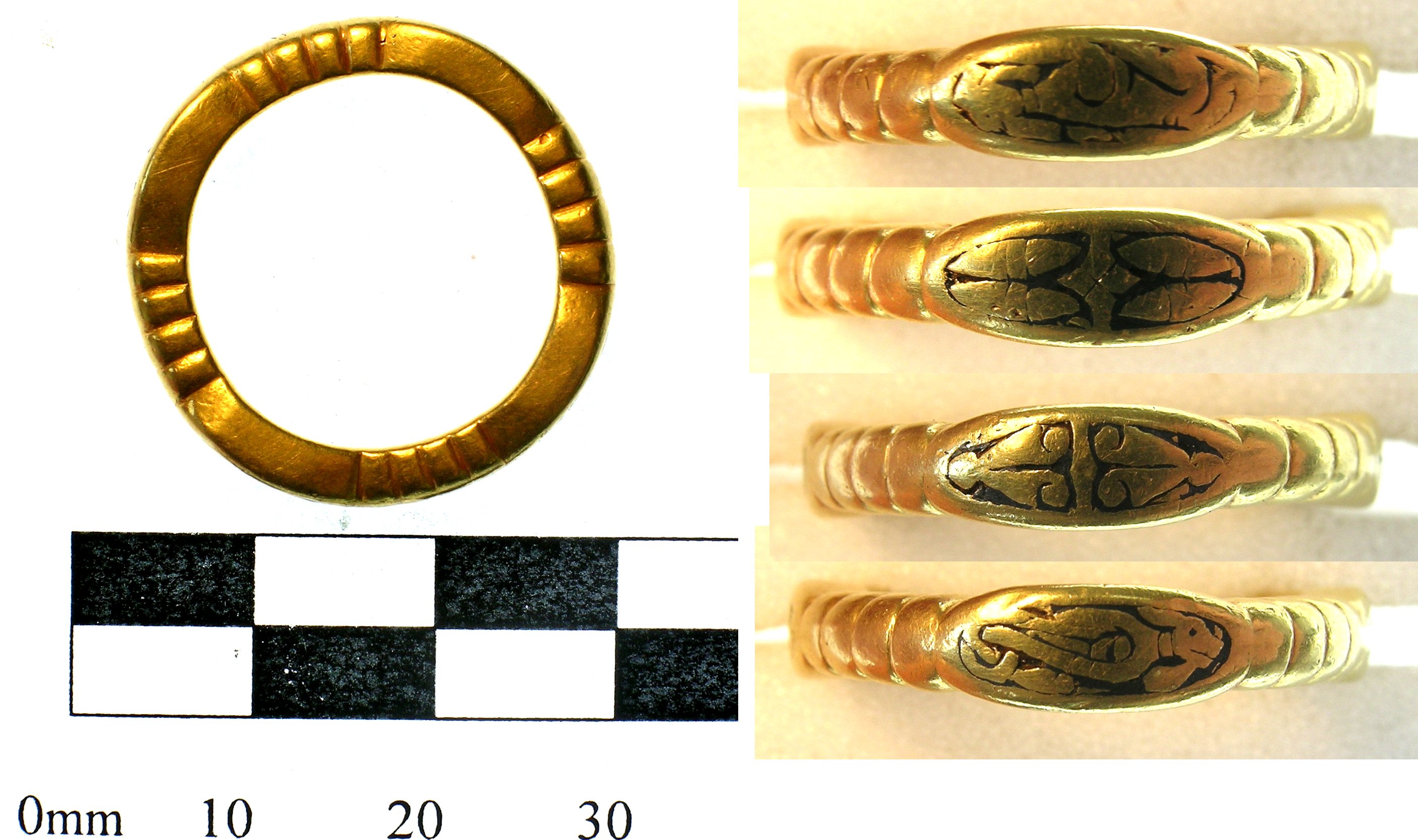
Niello finger ring, 2008

This well-worn gold ring is decorated with four panels with Trewhiddle style ornamentation in the form of two creatures and two plant motifs. This style of ornamentation dates from the ninth to the tenth century, which means this ring has an earlier date of production than the other three rings.

=== Other objects ===
==== Cloisonné fragment ====
This gold fragment would have originally been inlaid with glass or jewels and whilst neither of those were present, the cells that would have held them show signs that the pieces were levered out. It was part of a larger object, perhaps a brooch, and was produced in the seventh or eighth centuries.

==== Gold ingot fragment ====
The partial gold ingot shows clear cut marks and its form coincides with other pieces that have been dated to the ninth to eleventh centuries.

==== Lead disc ====
Usually interpreted as a small lead spindle whorl.

== Interpretation ==
Whilst archaeological investigation of the find-spot did not reveal a wider context for the site, it did show that the hole which the hoard had been placed in had been reopened and buried several times. The hoard contains material dating from the seventh to the tenth centuries, demonstrating that the items were preserved across several centuries. One interpretation is that the hoard belonged to a thief, who was adding and removing goods from the cache. Another interpretation is that it belonged to a smith or jeweller. The jewellery itself indicates wealth and high-status ownership potentially a member of an elite living in the Danelaw in the tenth or eleventh century.

== Acquisition ==
In 2011 Leeds Museums & Galleries ran a successful funding campaign to raise £171,310 in order for the hoard to remain in the region, be owned by the public and to be displayed at Leeds City Museum. Funding for the purchase of the hoard came from grants from: National Heritage Memorial Fund; Wolfson Foundation via the Art Fund; Leeds Philosophical & Literary Society and the Friends of Leeds City Museums who ran a crowd-funding campaign. Acquisition of the hoard for the city was confirmed in 2012.

== Display ==
The hoard was displayed at Leeds City Museum after further funding was secured from the Headley Trust, via Art Fund's Treasure Plus scheme. The display consisted of bespoke mounts, as well as 3D models of the hoard which visitors can digitally explore.

== Reception ==
In 2019, artist Lorna Johnson exhibited a new body of work, entitled Deconstructing The West Yorkshire Hoard, at the International Medieval Congress in Leeds.

The hoard also featured in the television series Britain's Secret Treasures and in the resultant publication.
