= Amongst the Medici =

2006 radio documentary series

Amongst the Medici is a radio documentary series by historian Bettany Hughes. The series originally aired in three parts on BBC Radio 4 in February and March 2006.

The series was billed as "a three part re-evaluation of one of the most creative and complicated partnerships in the western world" and examined the history of the Medici family during the Italian Renaissance, between 1397 (the founding of the Medici Bank) and 1497 (the Bonfire of the Vanities). Elisabeth Mahoney in The Guardian called the program "really well-produced, perfectly pitched art history for radio." In The Spectator, Michael Vestey also found the program enjoyable if perhaps too dismissive of the Medicis' contributions.

- Part 1 - Bankers to the Renaissance
- Part 2 - Renaissance, what renaissance?
- Part 3 - Smart women, gay men and false gods
