= Hockley Pendant =

16th-century gold reliquary pendant

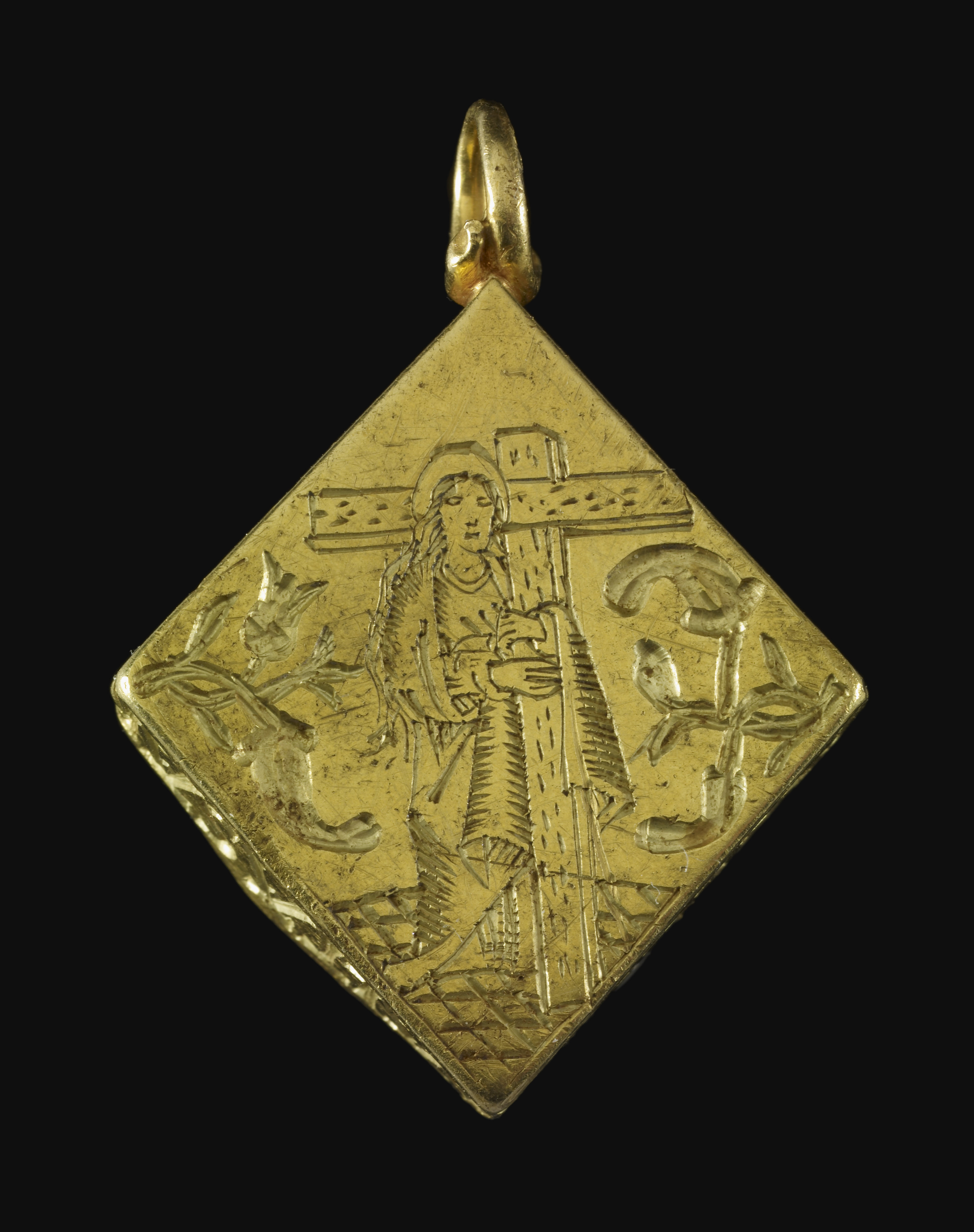
- Front view of the Hockley Pendant
- Material: Gold
- Created: 1500–1550 AD
- Period/culture: Early Modern Britain
- Discovered: 2009; Hockley, Essex
- Present location: British Museum

The Hockley Pendant is a diamond-shaped, gold reliquary pendant dating from the early sixteenth century. The pendant was discovered in 2009 by four-year-old James Hyatt, while metal detecting in a field in Hockley, Essex, with his father, Jason Hyatt. The pendant is decorated on the front with an image of a female saint supporting a cross. The back of the pendant displays an image of the Five Holy Wounds of Christ, and contains a sliding panel covering an interior space, which originally held a relic. The pendant was officially declared treasure and was acquired by the British Museum.

== Description ==
The Hockley Pendant is a diamond-shaped gold pendant with an attached gold bail. It is 3 cm (1.2 in) in length, weighs a third of an ounce (8.68g), and has a gold content of up to 73%. The front of the pendant is engraved with the image of a female saint carrying a cross. The cross is covered with marks that suggest drops of blood. Decorative foliage surrounds the central image. The figure is standing on a surface with a chequerboard design, indicating a tiled floor.

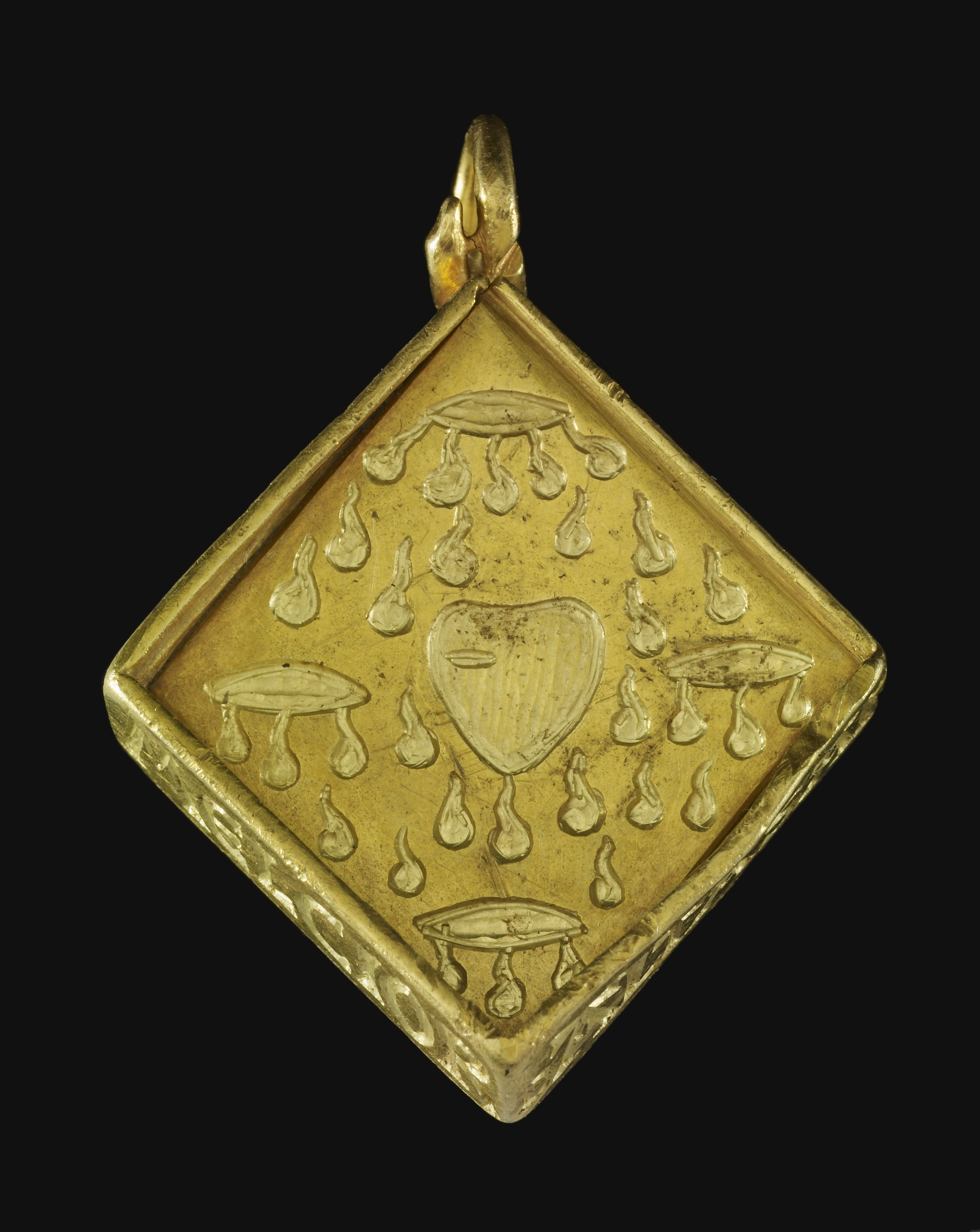
Pendant, reverse

The back of the pendant displays a heart, surrounded by four weeping cuts and drops of blood, suggesting the Five Holy Wounds of Christ. The inside of the pendant would have stored a relic, possibly a remnant of the True Cross. The four sides of the pendant display the names of the Three Magi: Caspar, Melchior and Balthazar, and decorative foliage. The inscription's words were believed to have the power to heal fevers and epilepsy, which was known then as falling-down sickness. The pendant's letters and decorative detail would have originally been enhanced with painted enamel. Objects such as the Hockley Pendant were meant for "intimate inspection" and needed an owner's "physical interaction" in order to "release its spiritual value".

== History ==
The pendant was discovered in 2009, by four-year-old James Hyatt and his father Jason Hyatt, from Billericay, while they were metal detecting in a field in Hockley, Essex. The pendant was officially declared treasure and was acquired by the British Museum. At the time, it was thought to be worth up to £2.5 m, which the Hyatt family and the landowner would have shared when the pendant was sold. However, the actual amount paid by the museum was only £70,000.

The pendant front displays an image of a female saint, possibly the Virgin Mary, or Saint Helena. The back of the pendant contained a panel, which may have held a relic of the True Cross. Similar pendants had compartments for either a holy person's remains of their body or an item belonging to the holy person. The pendant's back panel was tightly closed when found. The pendant was later repaired by the conservation staff at the British Museum. The back panel was opened to reveal a few flax fibres. The pendant has been dated to the early sixteenth century, from 1500 to 1550. It was featured on episode 49 of Britain's Secret Treasures on ITV in July 2012 "as one of the fifty most important archaeological finds made by the British public".

== See also ==
- Middleham Jewel
- Forsbrook Pendant
