= Spa Pump Room, Hockley =

Victorian building in Hockley, Essex, England

Coordinates: 51°36′08″N 0°39′28″E

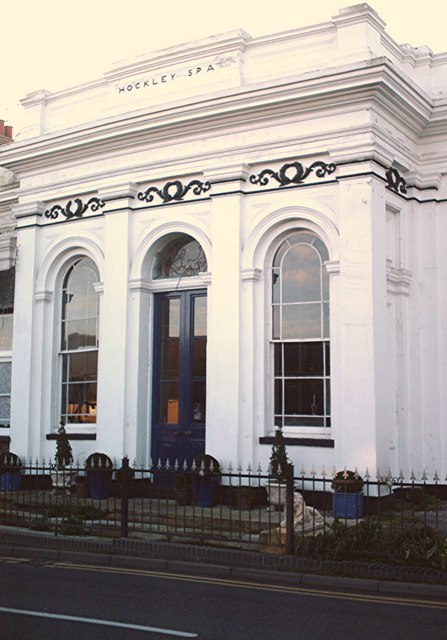
Spa Pump Room, Hockley

The Spa Pump Room is a Grade II listed, early Victorian building in Hockley, Essex. It was built to the designs of James Lockyer in 1842 after a medicinal spring was discovered on the site four years earlier. Short lived, the building closed as a pump room in the early 1850s and was used for other purposes thereafter, including a Baptist chapel, billiard hall, and a clothing factory; the pump room is now in private ownership.

== History ==
Robert Clay and his wife, Letitia, an ageing couple from Cheltenham, retired to Hockley in Essex, in 1838. The Clays, who had been users of Cheltenham's natural waters, rented a cottage in Hockley and dug a water well in its garden. Letitia, a chronic asthmatic, found relief in drinking the water and declared it to be medicinal; they renamed their cottage Hockley Spa Lodge. In order to capitalise on their discovery, and to emulate the kind of success that spas in Bath and Royal Tunbridge Wells had achieved, they sought advice from a local businessman, William Summersall, who later became the manager of the spa, on how to build a pumping room to access larger amounts of water for the wider public. The Clay's claimed that the water could heal asthma, indigestion, and infections of the liver, kidneys and bladder. On Summersall's advice, they invited Dr. A. B Granville, an author who become notable for his many books on the medicinal properties of the world's natural spas, to test the water. Granville was impressed and sent the samples to Sir Richard Phillips, a leading authority on natural consumables. It was Granville's mention of Hockley Spa in his book, The Spas of England, that brought Hockley's waters to national interest.

The Pump Room, c.1910

The Clays appointed the London-based architect James Lockyer to design a pumping room. Lockyer instructed the Blackheath-based builder George Whittenbury, who was a builder for the Metropolitan Police, to execute his designs. The building was completed in 1842. Lockyer designed it in the Italian style. Inside, there was wainscot panelling with oak features. The tables were made of marble and rosewood and the walls had gold leaf detailing. The chimney pieces were marble. The pump was located in a circular recess opposite the landing and was made mostly of satinwood and glass. It was mounted on a veined marble table and had a yellow glass handle and silver spout. The foundation stone was laid at the back of the pump in the head of the recess.

The Pump Room opened for business on 8 June 1843, a ticket only occasion that was marked by a banquet meal for 150 of the town's gentry and their city acquaintances. Despite Robert Clay's death in 1843, (Note: Robert Clay married Letitia née Case-Drackett at the church of St Botolph-without-Bishopsgate, London, on 13 August 1800. Clay died aged 72 in 1843, shortly after the spa opened. He was buried on 5 August 1843 in the churchyard of St Peter and Paul, Hockley. His wife, Letitia, died in 1847 and was interred with him, on 18 February.) the business flourished and the water became so much in demand that it was sent to a depot in Cripplegate, London, where it was bottled and distributed to other countries.

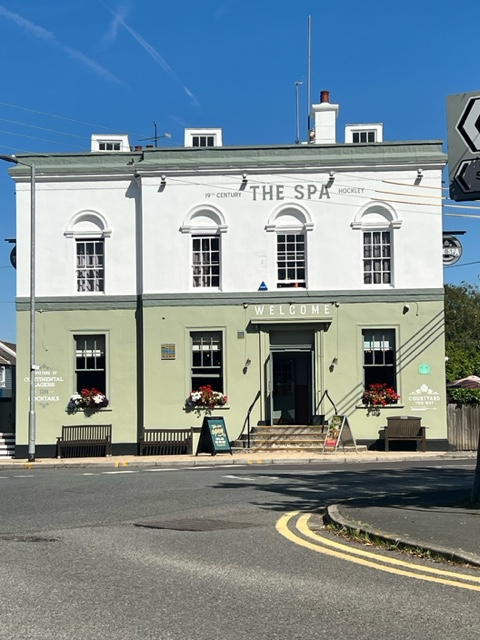
Spa Hotel, Hockley, taken after its renovation in 2023

By 1848 the spa had fallen out of favour and the Pump Room, together with the Spa Hotel, was put up for sale and offered with a 99-year lease. The author and historian Phillis Embry, in her 1997 book British Spas from 1815 to the Present Day, records the Pump Room's use as a baptist chapel in 1857, a function that lasted until at least 1871, noted that year in an article for the East London Observer. By 1880 the pump room had been abandoned completely. In 1896 The Essex Herald reported the attempts being made by a syndicate to recommission the well and to put the building back into use as a pump room. The Pump Room was converted into a private billiard hall in 1904. From 1947 the building was used as a clothing factory before it fell into private ownership. It was designated as a Grade II listed building in 1972.

== Associated buildings ==
In anticipation of the Spa's popularity, and to accommodate the visiting crowds, Lockyer designed the nearby Spa Hotel which was built at the same time as the Pump Room. When the Pump Room closed, the hotel was renamed the Royal Oak and became a pub. The victualler changed the name back to the Spa Hotel in 1891 and it remained a hotel until the 1960s. It is now in the ownership of the brewery Mitchells & Butlers who operate it is a village pub.

== Notes and references ==
Notes

== Sources ==
- Christie, Miller; Thresh, May (1910). The Mineral Waters and Medicinal Springs of Essex. London: Simpkin, Marshall & Co. ISBN 978-0-297-78142-4.
- Benton, Philip (1888). The History of Rochford Hundred. London: A. Harrington. ISBN 978-0-224-01288-1.
- Hembry, Phillis, May (1997). British Spas from 1815 to the Present: A Social History. London: Fairleigh Dickinson University Press. ISBN 978-1-6114-7153-3.
- Pevsner, Nikolaus; Beattie, James (2007). The Buildings of England: Essex. London: Yale University Press. ISBN 978-0-3001-1614-4.
