= The Spartans (TV series) =

British documentary series

- Presented by: Bettany Hughes
- Country of origin: United Kingdom
- Original language: English
- No. of episodes: 3

Production
- Producer: Lion Television Productions
- Running time: 155 minutes

Original release
- Network: Channel 4
- Release: 2002 – 2002

The Spartans is a three-part historical documentary series presented by Bettany Hughes and first broadcast on UK's Channel 4 on 17 November 2002. The series subsequently premiered on ABC in Australia on 1 June 2003 and on PBS in the United States on 6 August 2003.

A book, The Spartans: An Epic History by Paul Cartledge, accompanied the series.

== Episodes ==
Part 1 deals with the arrival of the Dorian settlers into the Eurotas valley, with a discussion of the dark-age culture that lived there before, that of Menelaus and his wife Helen (known to history as Helen of Troy). Once established, the Spartans expand westward into Messenia, enslaving the entire population, eventually becoming the dominant power in Laconia. During this time Lycurgus transforms the Spartan constitution into the militarised state we know of today. Homosexuality among men and boys was mandatory. The training of Spartan youths is explained, from their enrollment in the Agoge system right through to their attainment of citizenship. The class structure of the Lacedaemonian state (Helots, Perioeci, and the soldier-citizens themselves) is also covered. The episode ends with the battle of Thermopylae, in which 300 Spartans, including their king, Leonidas, were killed in action defending Greece from a Persian invasion.

Part 2 opens with the retreat of the Persians, after Thermopylae and the battle of Salamis. Athens, which had been allied with Sparta against Persia, begins to experience an expanded economy (and democracy under the leadership of Pericles). His construction of the long walls - fortifications which connect Athens to Piraeus - is considered to be a hostile act by an increasingly paranoid Sparta, and is the basis for future discord between the two states. Meanwhile, Spartan marriage customs are discussed, and the differences in the role of women in Sparta and the rest of Greece is studied (Spartan women were relatively "free"). At the age of 12, a boy was paired with an older man, usually one of the unmarried warriors, aged between 20 and 30. He was a surrogate mother and father, as well as a teacher and mentor, but he was also a lover. The 464 BC Sparta earthquake caused massive disruption, allowing the Helots to revolt. A desperate Sparta asks Athens for help, only to change their minds once it is clear that Athens could side with the Helots. Sparta expels the Athenians and, eventually, war begins. The surprising surrender of a Spartan detachment on the isle of Sphacteria is a major blow to Sparta's reputation of invincibility.

Part 3 introduces Alcibiades, an Athenian statesman who defects to Sparta and becomes an adviser and strategist. In particular, he suggests that Sparta takes the war to Syracuse, in Sicily, during which Athens suffers a major blow (including the capture of their entire expeditionary force). The Spartan Lysander, chief of its naval forces, begins to rise in power, and he eventually defeats the Athenian navy (which enables him to blockade Athens) and finally ends the war by successfully invading and subjugating Athens. Agesilaus, who becomes one of the kings of Sparta, finally sees Sparta become the dominant power in Greece. But decadence and corruption follow, along with a drastic reduction in the number of Spartan citizens. In time, these events lead to an irreversible decline in Sparta's fortunes, leading to war with Thebes and, in 371 BC, the end of Spartan pre-eminence after the battle of Leuctra.

== Home media releases ==
The series was released on VHS and Region 1 DVD by PBS Home Video on 27 April 2004. A Region 2 version was released by Dd Home Entertainment on 13 September 2004.
