= Britain's Secret Treasures =

British documentary on ITV

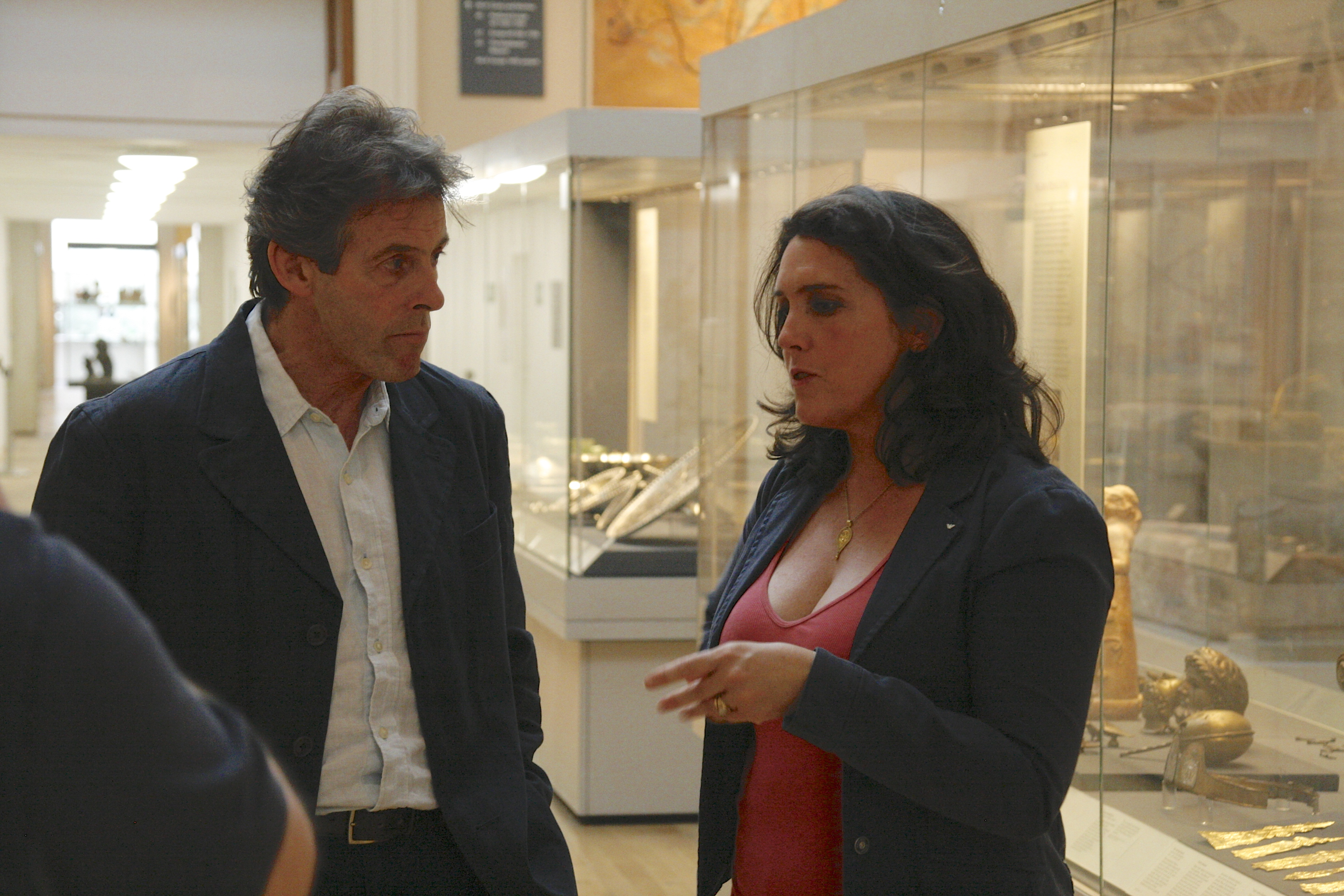
- Ralph Jackson (Curator of Romano-British Collections at the British Museum) and Bettany Hughes during filming at the British Museum
- Genre: Documentary
- Created by: Michael Kelpie; Ed Taylor
- Presented by: Michael Buerk; Bettany Hughes
- Country of origin: United Kingdom
- Original language: English
- No. of series: 2
- No. of episodes: 14

Production
- Executive producers: Michael Kelpie; Ed Taylor
- Running time: 30–60 mins
- Production company: ITV Studios

Original release
- Network: ITV
- Release: 16 July 2012 – 5 December 2013

Britain's Secret Treasures is a British documentary shown on ITV hosted by Michael Buerk and Bettany Hughes. The programme features fifty archaeological discoveries that have been made in England, Wales and Scotland by members of the public. With the exception of a single find made in Scotland, all the objects featured were recorded by the Portable Antiquities Scheme (PAS). Since the PAS was set up in 1997, some 800,000 objects have been registered with the scheme, many of them discovered by amateur metal detectorists.

The fifty finds have been selected by Hughes and a panel of experts from the British Museum (Roger Bland, Michael Lewis, Sally Worrell and Ian Richardson) and the Council for British Archaeology (Mike Heyworth) from among the nearly one million finds reported to the PAS on the basis of their historical and cultural significance, as well as on their aesthetic merit. The six episodes of Britain's Secret Treasures present the fifty objects in reverse order according to their importance as judged by the panel, in a countdown format, with the ten most important objects revealed during the sixth and final episode.

Taking the top slot in the countdown, as the most important object according to the panel, is a Lower Paleolithic flint handaxe made more than half a million years ago that was found on a beach in Happisburgh, Norfolk, in 2000 by a man taking his dog for a walk.

== Series overview ==
Series	Episodes	Originally released	
Series	Episodes	First released	Last released
1	6	16 July 2012	22 July 2012
2	8	17 October 2013	5 December 2013

== Episodes ==
=== Series 1 (2012) ===
No. overall	No. in series	Contributors	Objects	Original release date
1	1	John McCarthy; Saul David	45–50	16 July 2012
2	2	Michael Portillo; Nicky Clarke; Mary Ann Ochota; Claire Barratt	38–44	17 July 2012
3	3	Michael Portillo; John McCarthy; John Sergeant	27–37	18 July 2012
4	4	Dave Crisp (finder of the Frome Hoard); Brian Blessed; Mary Ann Ochota; Gethin Jones	19–26	19 July 2012
5	5	Dan Lobb; Mary Ann Ochota; Anita Rani; Jon Culshaw	11–18	20 July 2012
6	6	William Roache; Michael Portillo	1–10	22 July 2012

=== Series 2 (2013) ===
No. overall	No. in series	Contributors	Objects	Original release date
7	1	Mary Ann Ochota; James Purefoy	TBA	17 October 2013
8	2	Jim Moir; Tom Holland; Tanni Grey-Thompson	TBA	24 October 2013
9	3	Russell Grant; Tony Baker; Thomas Littleton; Suzannah Lipscomb	TBA	31 October 2013
10	4	TBA	TBA	7 November 2013
11	5	John Prescott; Mary Ann Ochota; Suzannah Lipscomb	TBA	14 November 2013
12	6	Mariella Frostrup; Ekow Eshun; Suzannah Lipscomb	TBA	21 November 2013
13	7	TBA	TBA	28 November 2013
14	8	Katherine Jenkins; Mary Ann Ochota	TBA	5 December 2013

== List of objects ==
Number	Image	Object	Date	Where Found	When Found	PAS Record
1		Happisburgh Handaxe	800,000 – 600,000 BC	Happisburgh, Norfolk	2000	NMS-ECAA52
2		Ringlemere Gold Cup	1700–1500 BC	Ringlemere barrow, Kent	2001	PAS-BE40C2
3		Staffordshire Hoard	550–650	Hammerwich, Staffordshire	2009	WMID-0B5416
4		Chalgrove Hoard	251–279	Chalgrove, Oxfordshire	2003	PAS-879F02
5		Boar Badge of Richard III	1470–1485	Sheepy, Leicestershire	2009	LEIC-A6C834
6		Hallaton Hoard	c. 400	Hallaton, Leicestershire	2000	PAS-984616
7		Staffordshire Moorlands Pan	100–199	Staffordshire Moorlands, Staffordshire	2003	WMID-3FE965
8		Baldehilde Seal	600–700	Broadland, Norfolk	1999	PAS-8709C3
9		Crosby Garrett Helmet	75–250	Crosby Garrett, Cumbria	2010	LANCUM-E48D73
10		Vale of York Hoard	c. 928	Harrogate, North Yorkshire	2007	SWYOR-AECB53
11		Near Lewes Hoard	1500–1100 BC	Lewes, East Sussex	2011	SUSS-C5D042
12		Blair Drummond Hoard	300–100 BC	Blair Drummond, Stirlingshire	2009	N/A
13		North West Essex Ring	580–650	Uttlesford, Essex	2011	ESS-E396B1
14		Ashwell Hoard	250–350	Baldock, Hertfordshire	2002	PAS-9708E3
15		Winchester Hoard	c. 100 BC	Winchester, Hampshire	2000	PAS-845331
16		Carlton-in-Lindrick knight	1150–1250	Bassetlaw, Nottinghamshire	2004	SWYOR-D37EE5
17		Seal Matrix of Stone Priory	1200–1300	Weybridge, Surrey	2011	SUR-B74173
18		Silverdale Hoard	900–910	Silverdale, Lancashire	2011	LANCUM-65C1B4
19		Leopard Cup	1–99	Llantilio Pertholey, Monmouthshire	2002	NMGW-9A9D16
20		Tisbury Hoard	800–600 BC	Tisbury, Wiltshire	2011	WILT-E8DA70
21		Saltfleetby Spindle Whorl	1000–1100	Saltfleetby, Lincolnshire	2010	LIN-D92A22
22		Milton Keynes Hoard	1150–750 BC	Milton Keynes, Buckinghamshire	2000	PAS-833958
23		Nether Stowey Hoard	c. 1633	Nether Stowey, Somerset	2008	SOM-849CA3
24		Marcus Aurelius Bust	100–200	Brackley, Northamptonshire	1976	BERK-E24C84
25		Frome Hoard	c. 293	Frome, Somerset	2009	SOM-5B9453
26		River Stour Pilgrims' Badges	1300–1500	Canterbury, Kent	?	PAS-B1BD65
27		French Forgeries	1711	Bishops Waltham, Hampshire	2010	HAMP-E4E185
28		Holderness Cross	600–650	Holderness, East Riding of Yorkshire	1965	YORYM214
29		West Yorkshire Hoard	900–1000	Leeds, West Yorkshire	2008–2009	SWYOR-F86A02; SWYOR-3B5652
30		Sedgeford Hoard	c. 100 BC	Sedgeford, Norfolk	2003	PAS-B1F065
31		Witch Bottle	1820–1880	Navenby, Lincolnshire	2003	LIN-49FC12
32		Hackney Hoard	1854–1913	Hackney, London	2007	PAS-867115
33		Llanbedrgoch Viking Finds	600–1000	Llanbedrgoch, Anglesey	2007	NMGW-C5EE45
34		Billingford Amulet	43–200	Billingford, Breckland, Norfolk	2003	NMS-7BEED8
35		Durham Assemblage	90–400	Piercebridge, County Durham	1986–2002	NCL-2C40A4; FAPJW-AB59E5
36		Langstone Hoard	25–75	Ringland, Newport	2007	NMGW-9C0216
37		Anarevito Gold Stater	10 BC – AD 20	Dover, Kent	2010	FASAM-FCD3A2
38		Hoard of Spanish-American Doubloons	1790–1801	North Kesteven, Lincolnshire	2010–2011	LIN-55BFE7
39		Beddingham Nose	1500–1700	Beddingham, East Sussex	2009	SUSS-05BC17
40		Putney Brothel Token	27 BC – 37 AD	Putney, London	2011	LON-E98F21
41		Cloth Seals from Durham	1550–1650	Elvet, Durham, County Durham	2008	PUBLIC-9B0430
42		Cautopates Figurine	43–307	Newton Kyme, North Yorkshire	2007	SWYOR-9FCBB3
43		Tanworth Comb	25–70	Tanworth-in-Arden, Warwickshire	2006	WAW-250340
44		Rochester Cuff-link	1660–1700	Rochester, Kent	2001	BM-CAA2C7
45		First World War Medal	1919	Limpsfield, Surrey	2009	SUR-5ADA50
46		Sedgeford Torc	c.200 BC	Sedgeford, Norfolk	2004	PAS-F070D5
47		Pitminster Toy Cannon	1700–1750	Pitminster, Somerset	2003	SOM-D20D91
48		Epsom Harness Boss	1603–1664	Epsom, Surrey	2009	SUR-23EF78
49		Hockley Pendant	1500–1550	Hockley, Essex	2009	ESS-2C4836
50		Roman Slave Shackle	200–400	Headbourne Worthy, Hampshire	1992	HAMP-C45106

== Objects submitted by viewers ==
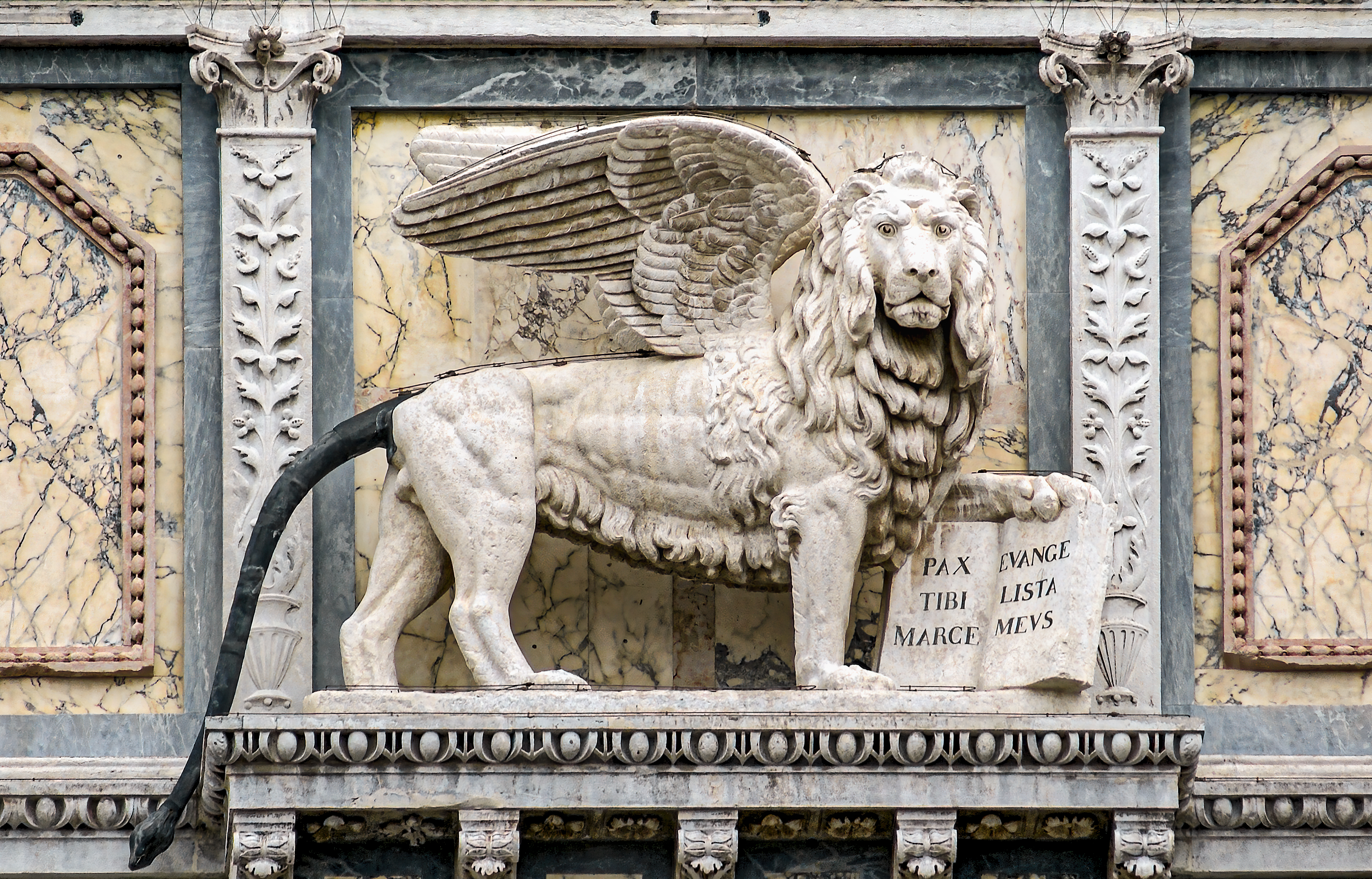
Sculpture of a winged lion with an open book showing the words Pax tibi, Marce, Evangelista meus on a Venetian building

At the beginning of the series viewers were invited to submit photographs of objects that they had found in England or Wales, so that experts from the British Museum could select the most interesting object, to be announced during the final episode.

The viewer-submitted object chosen as the most interesting by the panel was a small medieval bronze ornament in the form of an open book that was found in a field by the Pilgrims' Way at Bentley, Hampshire in 1997 (PAS record: HAMP527). The open pages of the book are engraved with the Latin inscription Pax tibi, Marce, Evangelista meus meaning "Peace to you, Mark, my evangelist". The traditional symbol of the Republic of Venice and the city of Venice is a winged lion (symbol of Mark the Evangelist), which is often depicted with one of its paws on an open book showing this same inscription, which suggests that the bronze book may have been a pilgrim's souvenir from Venice.

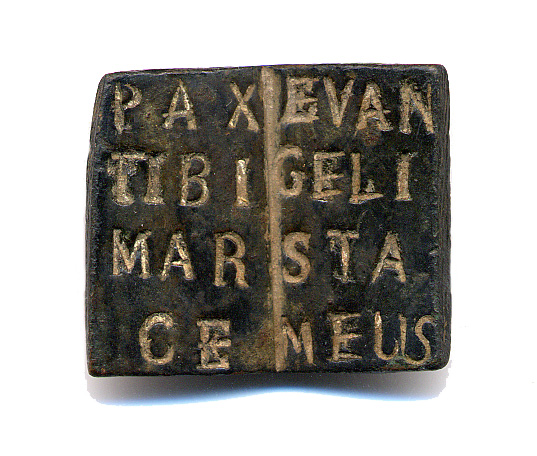
Front of medieval bronze book

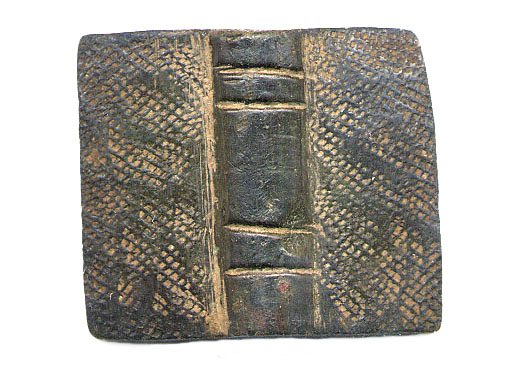
Back of medieval bronze book

== See also ==
- A History of the World in 100 Objects
- Our Top Ten Treasures
