= Carlton-in-Lindrick knight =

12th-century bronze figurine

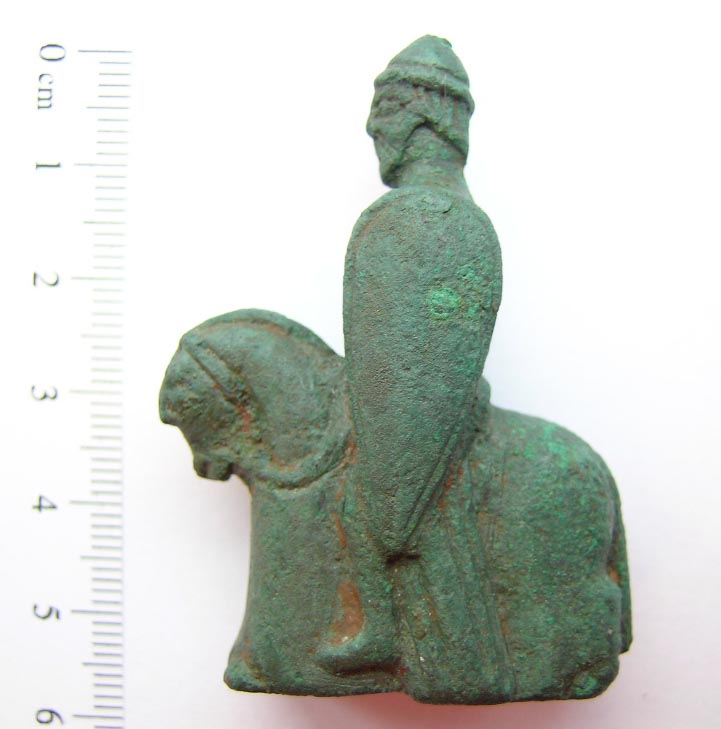
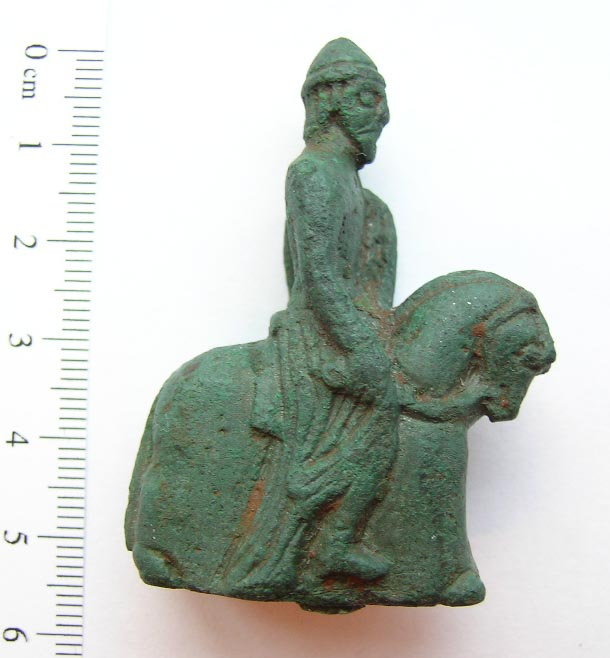
The Carlton-in-Lindrick knight

The Carlton-in-Lindrick knight is a small (6 cm tall) bronze figurine from the twelfth century, depicting a mounted knight armed for combat. It is an important find because period depictions of mounted European knights are relatively rare.

== Discovery and Acquisition ==
The figurine was discovered by use of a metal detector in 2004 in Bassetlaw, Nottinghamshire. It is currently in the Bassetlaw Museum in Retford. The figurine was sought by collections outside Britain, but the Art Fund and other funds joined with the Bassetlaw Museum to acquire it for local display.

== Depiction ==
The figurine depicts a mounted knight of the twelfth century, apparently armed for combat, as he is holding his shield and is in full armour. Characteristic of knights of the period, he wears a surcoat and very complete chainmail. Despite these typically 12th century characteristics, his helmet is conical and he carries a kite shield, both reminiscent of depictions of Norman knights in the Bayeux Tapestry of the previous century.

His warhorse wears a caparison.

== In popular culture ==
The Carlton-in-Lindrick knight was featured in the Britain's Secret Treasures documentary shown on ITV.
