= Hockley =

Village in Essex, England

Coordinates: 51.6014°N 0.6363°E

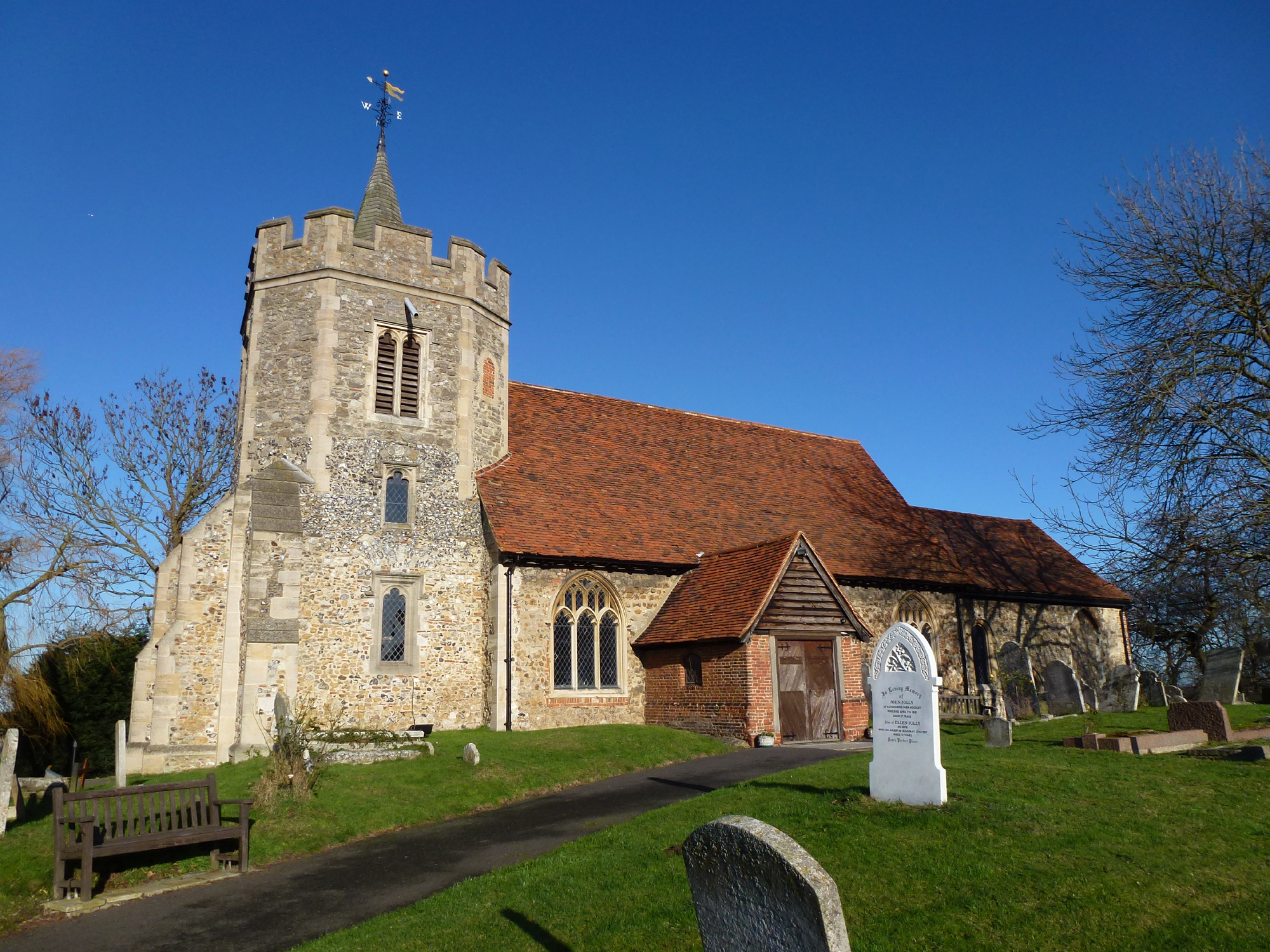
- Parish Church of St Peter and St Paul

- Location within Essex
- Interactive map of Hockley
- Population: 9,639 (Parish, 2021); 15,425 (Hockley and Hawkwell built up area, 2021)
- OS grid reference: TQ826924
- Civil parish: Hockley
- District: Rochford
- Shire county: Essex
- Region: East
- Country: England
- Sovereign state: United Kingdom
- Post town: HOCKLEY
- Postcode district: SS5
- Dialling code: 01702
- Police: Essex
- Fire: Essex
- Ambulance: East of England
- UK Parliament: Rayleigh

Hockley is a large village and civil parish in the Rochford District of Essex, England. It is located between Chelmsford and Southend-on-Sea, or, more specifically, between Rayleigh and Rochford. It came to prominence during the coming of the railway in the 1890s. At the 2021 census the parish had a population of 9,639. The urban area has grown to be contiguous with the neighbouring village of Hawkwell; the Office for National Statistics now classes them as a single built up area that it calls "Hockley and Hawkwell", which had a population of 15,425 in 2021.

Hockley railway station serves the village.

== History ==
The place-name 'Hockley' is first attested in the Domesday Book of 1086, where it appears as Hocheleia. The name means "Hocca's woodland clearing or glade". Today, there is still a large wooded area named Hockley Woods. Notable buildings in the village include the church of St Peter and Paul, which has a nave which was possibly built before the twelfth century, a thirteenth-century chancel and a fourteenth-century tower, the upper half of which is octagonal and was built at a later date. The tower holds three bells, manufactured by Miles Gray in 1626, by James Bartlett in 1684 and by John Hodgson in 1657, and the building is Grade II* listed. The church is situated to the north-west of the village centre, where Grade II listed Spa Pump Room is situated. The building was built as a spa to a design by James Lockyer in 1842, after Robert Clay found a medicinal spring there in 1838. Hockley is also the site of the former Bullwood Hall prison which closed in 2013.

Plumberow Mount, a Roman burial mound, was excavated in 1913 by Mr. E. B. Francis. At the time, there was a summer house on the top of the mound, and so trenches were cut on three sides. The excavation found a Roman coin of Domitian and some Saxon pottery which may indicate a secondary burial. The oval mound is 14 feet (4.3 m) high, and 76 feet (23 m) in diameter, with a flattened top, where the summerhouse was located. Since 2005, a metal fence has surrounded the mound to protect it from erosion, and a number of trees which were growing on or near it were cut down at the same time.

In 2009, the sixteenth-century Hockley Pendant was discovered in a field at Hockley.

== Governance ==
Hockley has a parish council consisting of two wards (West Ward and East Ward) and is part of Rochford District Council

The parish historically included Hullbridge, which was made a separate civil parish in 1964.
