= James Lockyer (architect) =

English architect and surveyor (1796 – 23 May 1875)

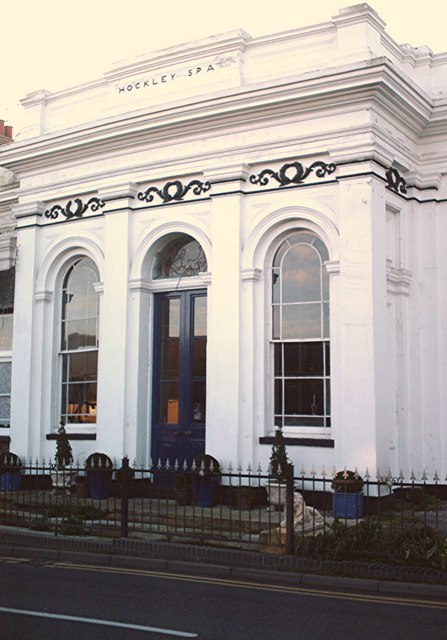
Spa Pump Room, Hockley

James Lockyer (1796 – 23 May 1875), sometimes styled as John Lockyer, was an English architect and surveyor, based in London. He worked mostly in the capital but also undertook work in the provinces.

== Biography ==
Lockyer served his pupillage under Robert Abraham before forming his own office. Lockyer worked mostly in London where he designed buildings in Oxford Street and New Bond Street. Perhaps his best known work in the capital was the Royal College of Chemistry in Central London in 1846, long since demolished. His provincial work included the Spa Pump Room, together with the nearby Spa Hotel, in Hockley, Essex. Both buildings survive, with the Pump Room being designated as a Grade II listed building.

In 1852 Lockyer re-designed the facade of what is now the Grade I listed White's, in Westminster, London. In 1855 he rebuilt the facade of 10 Henrietta Street and then, in 1861, the neighbouring property at 9, both Grade II listed buildings.

== Personal life ==
Lockyer married Anne Elizabeth née Morant at St George's, Hanover Square, London, on 27 July 1822. Together they had two sons who later became architects; James Morant (b.1824/5–1865), who, in 1852, designed the first Heal's store in Tottenham Court Road, and Gilbert (b.1838), who later inherited his father's business.

== Later years and death ==
Lockyer retired in around 1867 and left his practice to his son, Gilbert. Lockyer was living at 19 Fitzroy Square, Fitzrovia, at the time of his death from paralysis in 1875.
