= Bettany Hughes =

English historian and broadcaster (born 1967)

Bettany Hughes OBE FSA
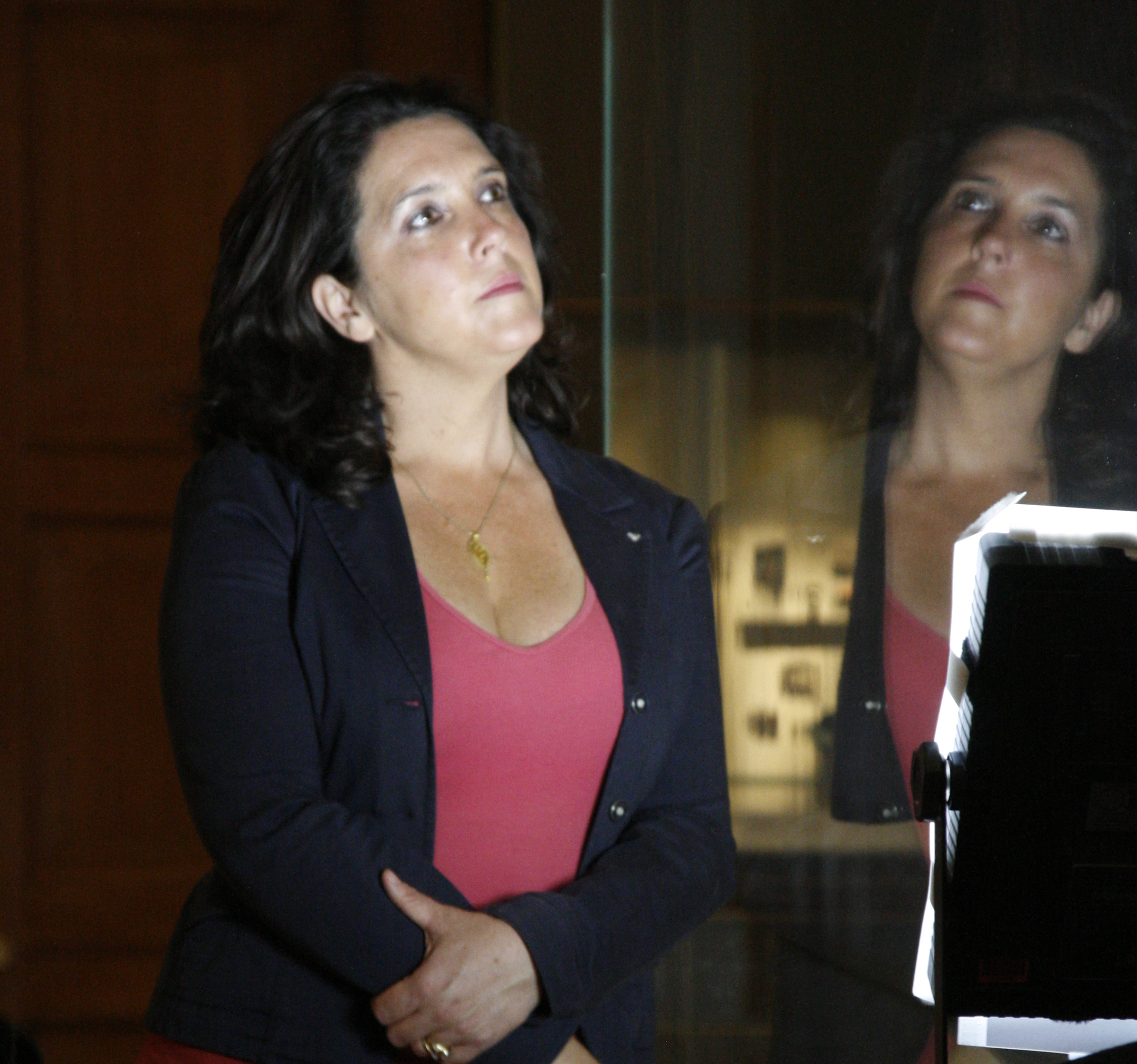
- Hughes filming Britain's Secret Treasures at the British Museum, 2013
- Born: 1967 (age 58–59)
- Education: Notting Hill and Ealing High School; St Hilda's College, Oxford
- Occupations: Historian, author, broadcaster
- Known for: Television history; radio broadcasting; author
- Television: Britain's Secret Treasures
- Spouse: Adrian Evans
- Children: 2
- Parent(s): Peter Hughes, Erica Hughes
- Relatives: Simon Hughes (brother)
- Hughes's voice Recorded 2012, as part of an audio description for VocalEyes
- Website: bettanyhughes.co.uk

Bettany Hughes OBE FSA (born 1967) is an English historian, author, and broadcaster, specialising in classical history. Her published books cover classical antiquity and myth, and the history of Istanbul. She is active in efforts to encourage the teaching of the classics in UK state schools. Hughes was appointed OBE in 2019.

== Early life and education ==
Hughes grew up in West London. She is the daughter of actors Peter and Erica Hughes, and the sister of the cricketer and journalist Simon Hughes. She was educated at Notting Hill and Ealing High School in Ealing, and at St Hilda's College, Oxford, where she graduated with a degree in ancient and modern history.

She has an honorary doctorate from the University of York.

== Career ==
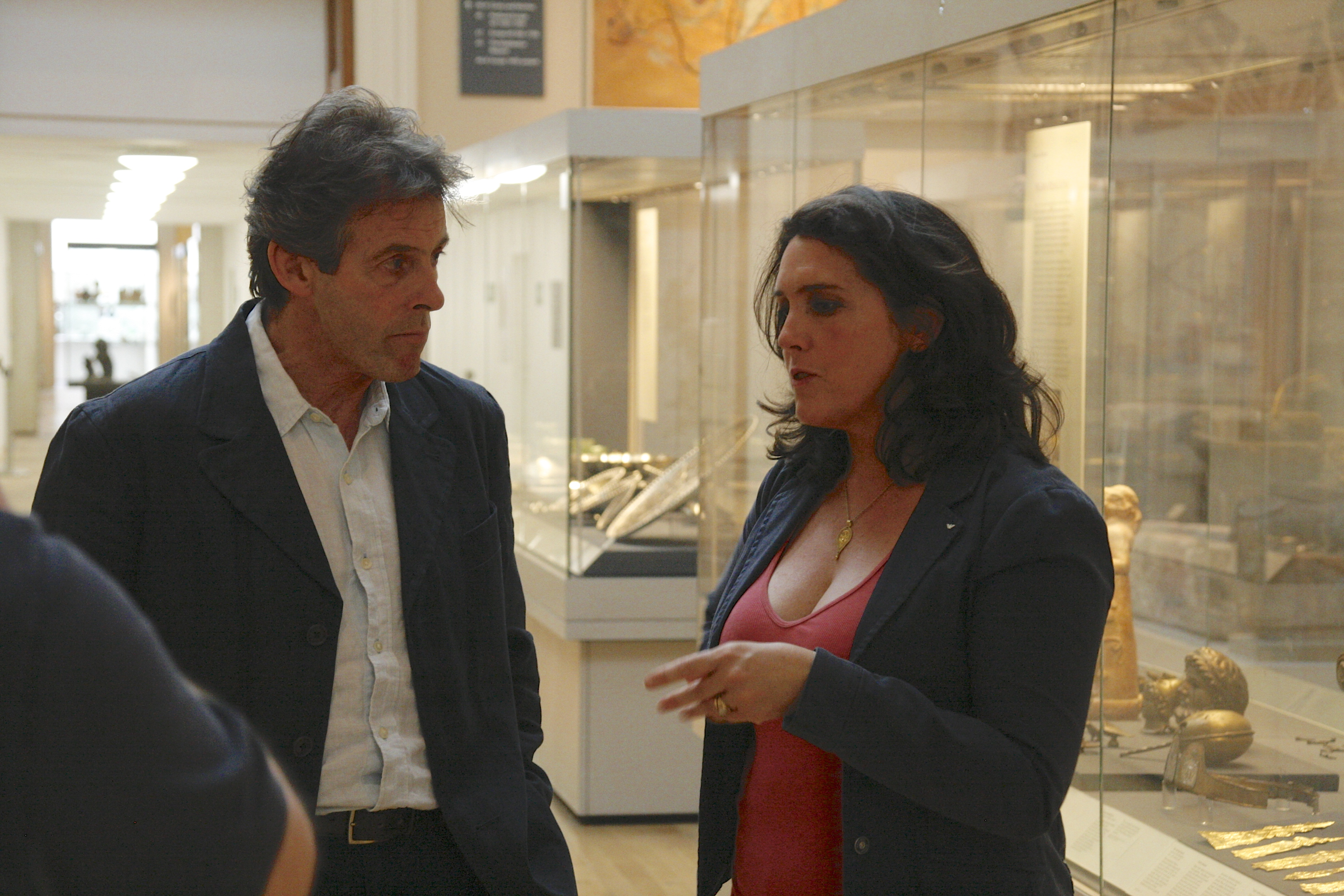
Hughes speaking with Ralph Jackson (Curator of Romano-British Collections at the British Museum) during filming of Britain's Secret Treasures at the British Museum

She is a visiting research fellow at King's College London, formerly a tutor for Cambridge University's Institute of Continuing Education, and an honorary fellow at Cardiff University.

Hughes has written and presented many documentary films and series on both ancient and modern subjects. In 2009, she was awarded the Naomi Sargant Special Award for excellence in educational broadcasting, and in 2012 she was awarded the Norton Medlicott Award for services to history by the Historical Association, of which she is an honorary fellow.

In 2010, she gave the Hellenic Institute's Tenth Annual lecture "Ta Erotika: The Things of Love"; in 2011, Hughes gave the Royal Television Society's Huw Wheldon Memorial Lecture, in which she argued that history on television is thriving and enjoying a new golden age. In 2011, she chaired the Orange Prize for Fiction, the UK's only annual book award for fiction written by women.

Hughes is a patron of The Iris Project, a charity that promotes the teaching of Latin and Greek in UK state schools. She is an honorary patron of Classics For All, a national campaign to get classical languages and the study of ancient civilisations back into state schools. She is an advisor to the Foundation for Science, Technology and Civilisation which aims to foster large-scale collaborative projects between East and West.

In 2014, she was made a Distinguished Friend of the University of Oxford. Hughes is a Vice President of the National Churches Trust.

She was elected as a Fellow of the Society of Antiquaries of London (FSA) on 3 March 2017. She was appointed Officer of the Order of the British Empire (OBE) in the 2019 Birthday Honours for services to history.

== Personal life ==
Hughes is married to Adrian Evans, events director and producer, who was pageant master for the Diamond and Platinum Jubilees; the couple have two daughters Sorrel and May.

Hughes is a vegetarian. In 2016, she delivered the British Humanist Association's annual Voltaire Lecture.

== Bibliography ==
- Helen of Troy: Goddess, Princess, Whore (2005)
- The Hemlock Cup: Socrates, Athens and the Search for the Good Life (2010)
  - The Hemlock Cup was included in The New York Times Bestseller List. It was chosen as Book of the Year by The Daily Telegraph, and it was featured as a Book of the Week on BBC Radio 4. It was shortlisted for a Writer's Guild Award.
- Istanbul: A Tale of Three Cities (2017)
  - Istanbul was reviewed by The New York Review of Books and was shortlisted for the Runciman Award in 2018.
- Venus and Aphrodite (2019)
  - Venus and Aphrodite was shortlisted in 2021 for the Runciman Award.
- The Seven Wonders of the Ancient World (2024)
- There Was a Roman in Your Garden (2025)

== Other writings ==
- "Helen of Troy: Goddess, Princess, Whore" – European Cultural Centre of Delphi, XIII International Meeting On Ancient Drama 2007, The Women in Ancient Drama, Symposium Proceedings
- "'Terrible, Excruciating, Wrong-Headed And Ineffectual': The Perils and Pleasures of Presenting Antiquity to a Television Audience" – Dunstan Lowe, Kim Shahabudin (ed.), Classics for All: Reworking Antiquity in Mass Culture. Newcastle upon Tyne: Cambridge Scholars Publishing, 2009, ISBN 978-1443801201

== Filmography ==
=== Television ===
Year	Title	Network	Notes	Ref.
2002	The Spartans	Channel 4	Part of The Ancient World documentary series	
2003	The First Age 6000 BC – 1000 BC	Channel 4	Part of Seven Ages of Britain (2003 TV series) documentary series	
2003	The Second Age 1000 BC – 43 AD	Channel 4	Part of Seven Ages of Britain (2003 TV series) documentary series	
2003	The Third Age 43 AD – 410 AD	Channel 4	Part of Seven Ages of Britain (2003 TV series) documentary series	
2003	The Fourth Age 410 AD – 1066 AD	Channel 4	Part of Seven Ages of Britain (2003 TV series) documentary series	
2003	The Fifth Age 1066 AD – 1350 AD	Channel 4	Part of Seven Ages of Britain (2003 TV series) documentary series	
2003	The Sixth Age 1350 AD – 1530 AD	Channel 4	Part of Seven Ages of Britain (2003 TV series) documentary series	
2003	The Seventh Age 1530 AD – 1700 AD	Channel 4	Part of Seven Ages of Britain (2003 TV series) documentary series	
2004	The Minoans	Channel 4	Part of The Ancient World documentary series	
2005	When the Moors Ruled in Europe	Channel 4	Part of The Ancient World documentary series	
2005	Helen of Troy	Channel 4	Part of The Ancient World documentary series	
2007	Athens: The Truth about Democracy	Channel 4	Part of The Ancient World documentary series	
2008	Engineering Ancient Egypt	Channel 4	Part of The Ancient World documentary series	
2009	Onslaught	History Channel	Part of The Roman Invasion of Britain documentary series	
2009	Revolt	History Channel	Part of The Roman Invasion of Britain documentary series	
2009	Dominion	History Channel	Part of The Roman Invasion of Britain documentary series	
2010	Alexandria: The Greatest City	Channel 4	Part of The Ancient World documentary series	
2010	The Daughters of Eve	Channel 4	Part of The Bible: A History	
2010	The Day Jesus Died	BBC1		
2010	What's the Point of Forgiveness?	BBC1		
2010	Atlantis: The Evidence	BBC2		
2011	Seven Wonders of the Buddhist World	BBC2		
2012	Divine Women	BBC2		
2012–2013	Britain's Secret Treasures	ITV	Co-presented with Michael Buerk	
2013	Britain's Secret Homes	ITV	Co-presented with Michael Buerk	
2015	Genius of the Ancient World	BBC4		
2016	Genius of the Modern World	BBC4		
2017	Eight Days That Made Rome	Channel 5		
2017	Venus Uncovered: Ancient Goddess of Love	BBC4		
2018	Bacchus Uncovered: Ancient God of Ecstasy	BBC4		
2019	Mars Uncovered: Ancient God of War	BBC4		
2019	The Nile: Egypt's Great River	Channel 5		
2019	Egypt's Great Treasures	Channel 5		
2020	A Greek Odyssey	Channel 5		
2020	Secrets of Pompeii's Greatest Treasures	Channel 5		
2021	Egypt's Great Mummies: Unwrapped with Bettany Hughes	Channel 5	Also known as Top Ten Treasures: Egyptian Mummies	
2021	Pompeii: Secrets of the Dead	Channel 5	One-off documentary	
2021–2025	Bettany Hughes' Treasures of the World	Channel 4	Four series	
2022	From Paris to Rome with Bettany Hughes	Channel 5	Travel series	
2023	Exploring India's Treasures with Bettany Hughes	Channel 4	Two-part documentary series	
2025	Seven Wonders of the Ancient World	Channel 5	Three-part documentary series	
2025	Bettany Hughes' Lost Worlds: The Nabataeans	Channel 4	Three-part documentary series	
2026	Bettany Hughes' Lost Worlds: Dawn of Civilisations	Channel 4	Two-part documentary series	
TBA	Secrets of the City	Channel 4	Upcoming six-part documentary series	

== Radio ==
- Amongst the Medici (2006) BBC Radio 4

== Recognition ==
She was recognized as one of the BBC's 100 Women of 2013.
