= The Roman Invasion of Britain =

- Genre: Documentary
- Starring: Bettany Hughes
- Country of origin: United Kingdom
- Original language: English
- No. of series: 1
- No. of episodes: 3

Production
- Running time: 45 minutes

Original release
- Release: 2009

The Roman Invasion of Britain is a British documentary television series hosted by Bettany Hughes. It was first aired in 2009 on the History Channel in the United Kingdom. The three-part series explores the history of Roman Britain by tracing the interaction of Roman conquerors with the native population of Britannia.

In the United States, it was later seen on the Smithsonian Channel.

== Episode list ==
1. Onslaught
2. Revolt
3. Dominion
