= Programming domain =

Programming environment

The term programming domain is mostly used when referring to domain-specific programming languages. It refers to a set of programming languages or programming environments that were written specifically for a particular domain, where domain means a broad subject for end users such as accounting or finance, or a category of program usage such as artificial intelligence or email. Languages and systems within a single programming domain would have functions common to the domain and may omit functions that are irrelevant to a domain.

Some examples of programming domains are:

- Expert systems, computer systems that emulate the decision-making ability of a human expert and are designed to solve complex problems by reasoning through bodies of knowledge.
- Natural-language processing, handling interactions between computers and human (natural) languages such as speech recognition, natural-language understanding, and natural-language generation.
- Computer vision, dealing with how computers can understand and automate tasks that the human visual system can do and extracting data from the real world.

Other programming domains would include:

- Application scripting
- Array programming
- Artificial-intelligence reasoning
- Cloud computing
- Computational statistics
- Contact Management Software
- E-commerce
- Financial time-series analysis
- General-purpose applications
- Image processing
- Internet
- Numerical mathematics
- Programming education
- Relational database querying
- Software prototyping
- Symbolic mathematics
- Systems design and implementation
- Text processing
- Theorem proving
- Video game programming and development
- Video processing
- Computer graphics

== See also ==
- Domain (software engineering)
- Domain-specific language
