= Reusability (disambiguation) =

Reusability is a term in computer science.

Reusability may also refer to:

- The quality of being fit for reuse
- Reusable packaging
