= International Conference on Software Reuse =

The International Conference on Software Reuse (ICSR), is the primary scientific conference on software reuse, domain analysis, and domain engineering.

ICSR includes software reuse researchers, practitioners, and managers. The conference provides an archival source for important reuse papers. The conference is also meant to provide reuse information and education to practitioners, and to be an ongoing platform for technology transfer.

Software reusability, the use of knowledge or artifacts from existing systems to build new ones, is a key software engineering technology important both to engineers and managers. Reuse research has been very active. Many organizations have reported reuse successes, yet there are still important research issues in systematic reuse. There is a need for reuse solutions that can be applied across domain and organization boundaries. The conference consists of technical presentations, parallel working groups, plenary sessions, demonstrations, and tutorials.

Topics include reuse metrics, case studies and experiments, copyright and legal issues, current issues in reuse libraries, distributed components, formal methods, design and validation of components, domain analysis and engineering, generators, and Integration frameworks.

List of conferences:

Conference	Location	Dates
ICSR 22	Ottawa, Canada	April 27, 2025
ICSR 21	Limasson, Cyprus	June 19-20, 2024
ICSR 20	Montpellier, France	June 15-17, 2022
ICSR 19	Hammamet, Tunisia	December 2-4, 2020
ICSR 18	Cincinnati, USA	June 26-28, 2019
ICSR 17	Madrid, Spain	May 21-13, 2018
ICSR 16	Salvador, Brazil	May 29–31, 2017
ICSR-15	Cyprus	June 5–7, 2016
ICSR-14	University of Miami, Coral Gables, FL	January 4–6, 2015
ICSR-13	Pisa, Italy	June 18–21, 2013
ICSR-12	Pohang, South Korea	June 13–17, 2011
ICSR-11	Falls Church, VA, USA	September 27–30, 2009
ICSR-10	Beijing, China	May 25–29, 2008
ICSR-9	Turin, Italy	June 12–15, 2006
ICSR-8	Madrid, Spain	July 5–9, 2004
ICSR-7	Austin, TX, USA	April 15–19, 2002
ICSR-6	Vienna, Austria	June 27–29, 2000
ICSR-5	Victoria, B.C., Canada	June 2–5, 1998
ICSR-4	Orlando, FL, USA	April 23–26, 1996
ICSR-3	Rio de Janeiro, Brazil	1994
IWSR-2	Lucca, Italy	1992
IWSR-1	Dortmund, Germany	1991
WISR3	Syracuse University	June 13–15, 1990
