= Reuse metrics =

In software engineering, many reuse metrics and models are metrics used to measure code reuse and reusability. A metric is a quantitative indicator of an attribute of a thing. A model specifies relationships among metrics. Reuse models and metrics can be categorized into six types:

1. reuse cost-benefits models
2. maturity assessment
3. amount of reuse
4. failure modes
5. reusability
6. reuse library metrics

Reuse cost-benefits models include economic cost-benefit analysis as well as quality and productivity payoff. Maturity assessment models categorize reuse programs by how advanced they are in implementing systematic reuse. Amount of reuse metrics are used to assess and monitor a reuse improvement effort by tracking percentages of reuse for life cycle objects. Failure modes analysis is used to identify and order the impediments to reuse in a given organization. Reusability metrics indicate the likelihood that an artifact is reusable. Reuse library metrics are used to manage and track usage of a reuse repository.
