= Enterprise Library =

Enterprise Library can be one of the following:

- Microsoft Enterprise Library, a collection of .NET API's for enterprise programming.
- Enterprise Library (Las Vegas) a library that is a part of the Las Vegas-Clark County Library District.
- Enterprise Public Library (Mississippi), Enterprise, Mississippi.
- Enterprise Public Library (Oregon), Enterprise, Oregon, listed on the National Register of Historic Places in Wallowa County, Oregon
