= Daab =

DAAB or Daab may refer to:

- Dyersburg Army Air Base, a World War II air base in Tennessee, United States
- Daab (band), a Polish reggae band
- Daab (sword), a Thai single-edge sword/martial arts weapon
- Data Access Application Block, a programming library in Microsoft Enterprise Library
- Blida Airport, Algeria (ICAO code: DAAB)
