= Abhik Roychoudhury =

Computer scientist

- Born: 1973 (age 52–53); Calcutta
- Education: State University of New York at Stony Brook (PhD)
- Known for: Automated program repair, fuzz testing
- Scientific career
- Fields: software engineering, Agent-oriented software engineering, program analysis, computer security
- Workplaces: National University of Singapore

Abhik Roychoudhury is a Singaporean computer scientist and academic known for his contributions to software engineering, particularly in program analysis, agent-oriented software engineering, software testing, and computer security. He is a Provost's Chair Professor at the National University of Singapore (NUS) and serves as editor-in-chief of ACM Transactions on Software Engineering and Methodology (TOSEM).

== Education ==
Abhik Roychoudhury received his Ph.D. in computer science from the State University of New York at Stony Brook in 2000.

== Career ==
Abhik Roychoudhury has been affiliated with the National University of Singapore since 2001. He joined as an assistant professor in the Department of Computer Science and was promoted to Associate Professor in 2007 and Professor in 2014. In 2020, he was appointed Provost's Chair Professor.

He became editor-in-chief of ACM Transactions on Software Engineering and Methodology (TOSEM) in 2025 and has held roles such as Steering Committee Chair of the ACM SIGSOFT Foundations of Software Engineering (FSE). He has also served as General Chair of FSE 2022 and Program Co-chair of the International Conference on Software Engineering (ICSE) 2024.

In May 2026, his work on AutoCodeRover agent for program repair was launched as a commercial product called SonarQube Remediation Agent. This launch was subsequent to an acquisition of the AutoCodeRover spinoff in February 2025.

== Awards and honors ==
- University Research Recognition Award, National University of Singapore, 2026
- Inaugural Class of the ACM SIGSOFT Software Engineering Academy, 2026
- Fellow of the Association for Computing Machinery (ACM), 2024, for contributions to automated program repair and fuzz testing
- Outstanding Graduate Mentor Award, National University of Singapore, 2024
- Most Influential Paper Award (Test-of-Time), 2023, for the 2013 paper "SemFix", International Conference on Software Engineering
- IEEE TCSE New Directions Award, 2022
- Distinguished member of the Association for Computing Machinery, 2020
