= Eppinger =

Eppinger is a surname. Notable people with the surname include:

- Hans Eppinger (1879–1946), Austrian physician
- Jeffrey L. Eppinger (born c. 1960), American computer scientist, entrepreneur and Professor at the Carnegie Mellon University
- Steven D. Eppinger (born 1961), American engineer, and Professor of Management

== See also ==
- Euclides D crater, a satellite crater of Euclides, formerly known as Eppinger
