= ICSR =

ICSR or I.C.S.R. may refer to:

- Individual Case Safety Report, in pharmacovigilance
- International Conference on Social Robotics
- International Conference on Software Reuse
- International Centre for the Study of Radicalisation and Political Violence, based in the Department of War Studies at King's College London
