= Expression problem =

Data abstraction problem in programming languages

The expression problem is a problem in programming languages that concerns the extensibility and modularity of statically typed data abstractions. The goal is to define a data abstraction that is extensible both in its representations and its behaviors, where one can add new representations and new behaviors to the data abstraction, without recompiling existing code, and while retaining static type safety (e.g., no casts). The statement of the problem exposes deficiencies in programming paradigms and programming languages. Philip Wadler, one of the co-authors of Haskell, has originated the term.

== History ==
Philip Wadler formulated the challenge and named it "The Expression Problem" in response to a discussion with Rice University's Programming Languages Team (PLT). He also cited three sources that defined the context for his challenge:

The problem was first observed by John Reynolds in 1975. Reynolds discussed two forms of Data Abstraction: User-defined Types, which are now known as Abstract Data Types (ADTs) (not to be confused with Algebraic Data Types), and Procedural Data Structures, which are now understood as a primitive form of Objects with only one method. He argued that they are complementary, in that User-defined Types could be extended with new behaviors, and Procedural Data Structures could be extended with new representations. He also discussed related work going back to 1967. Fifteen years later in 1990, William Cook applied Reynold's idea in the context of Objects and Abstract Data Types, which had both grown extensively. Cook identified the matrix of representations and behaviors that are implicit in a Data Abstraction, and discussed how ADTs are based on the behavioral axis, while Objects are based on the representation axis. He provides extensive discussion of work on ADTs and Objects that are relevant to the problem. He also reviewed implementations in both styles, discussed extensibility in both directions, and also identified the importance of static typing. Most importantly, he discussed situations in which there was more flexibility than Reynolds considered, including internalization and optimization of methods.

At ECOOP '98, Shriram Krishnamurthi et al. presented a design pattern solution to the problem of simultaneously extending an expression-oriented programming language and its tool-set. They dubbed it the "expressivity problem" because they thought programming language designers could use the problem to demonstrate the expressive power of their creations. For PLT, the problem had shown up in the construction of DrScheme, now DrRacket, and they solved it via a rediscovery of mixins. To avoid using a programming language problem in a paper about programming languages, Krishnamurthi et al. used an old geometry programming problem to explain their pattern-oriented solution. In conversations with Felleisen and Krishnamurthi after the ECOOP presentation, Wadler understood the PL-centric nature of the problem and he pointed out that Krishnamurthi's solution used a cast to circumvent Java's type system. The discussion continued on the types mailing list, where Corky Cartwright (Rice) and Kim Bruce (Williams) showed how type systems for OO languages might eliminate this cast. In response Wadler formulated his essay and stated the challenge, "whether a language can solve the expression problem is a salient indicator of its capacity for expression." The label "expression problem" puns on expression = "how much can your language express" and expression = "the terms you are trying to represent are language expressions".

Others co-discovered variants of the expression problem around the same time as Rice University's PLT, in particular Thomas Kühne in his dissertation, and Smaragdakis and Batory in a parallel ECOOP 98 article.

Some follow-up work used the expression problem to showcase the power of programming language designs.

The expression problem is also a fundamental problem in multi-dimensional Software Product Line design and in particular as an application or special case of FOSD Program Cubes.

== Solutions ==
There are various solutions to the expression problem. Each solution varies in the amount of code a user must write to implement them, and the language features they require.

- Multiple dispatch
- Ruby syntax § Open classes
- Coproducts of functors
- JavaGI type classes
- Tagless-final / Object algebras
- Polymorphic Variants

== Example ==
=== Problem description ===
We can imagine we do not have the source code for the following library, written in C#, which we wish to extend:

interface IEvalExp
{
    int Eval();
}

class Lit : IEvalExp
{
    internal Lit(int n)
    {
        N = n;
    }

    internal int N { get; }

    public int Eval()
    {
        return N;
    }
}

class Add : IEvalExp
{
    internal Add(IEvalExp left, IEvalExp right)
    {
        Left = left;
        Right = right;
    }

    internal IEvalExp Left { get; }

    internal IEvalExp Right { get; }

    public int Eval()
    {
        return Left.Eval() + Right.Eval();
    }
}

static class ExampleOne
{
    static IEvalExp AddOneAndTwo() => new Add(new Lit(1), new Lit(2));
    static int EvaluateTheSumOfOneAndTwo() => AddOneAndTwo().Eval();
}

Using this library we can express the arithmetic expression 1 + 2 as we did in ExampleOne.AddOneAndTwo() and can evaluate the expression by calling .Eval(). Now imagine that we wish to extend this library, adding a new type is easy because we are working with an Object-oriented programming language. For example, we might create the following class:

class Mult : IEvalExp
{
    internal Mult(IEvalExp left, IEvalExp right)
    {
        Left = left;
        Right = right;
    }

    internal IEvalExp Left { get; }

    internal IEvalExp Right { get; }

    public int Eval()
    {
        return Left.Eval() * Right.Eval();
    }
}

However, if we wish to add a new function over the type (a new method in C# terminology), for example to pretty print an expression, we have to change the IEvalExp interface and then modify all the classes that implement the interface. Another possibility is to create a new interface that extends the IEvalExp interface and then create sub-types for Lit, Add and Mult classes, but the expression returned in ExampleOne.AddOneAndTwo() has already been compiled so we will not be able to use the new function over the old type. The problem is reversed in functional programming languages like F# where it is easy to add a function over a given type, but extending or adding types is difficult.

=== Problem solution using object algebra ===
Let us redesign the original library with extensibility in mind using the ideas from the paper Extensibility for the Masses.

interface ExpAlgebra<T>
{
    T Lit(int n);
    T Add(T left, T right);
}

class ExpFactory : ExpAlgebra<IEvalExp>
{
    public IEvalExp Lit(int n)
    {
        return new Lit(n);
    }

    public IEvalExp Add(IEvalExp left, IEvalExp right)
    {
        return new Add(left, right);
    }
}

static class ExampleTwo<T>
{
    public static T AddOneToTwo(ExpAlgebra<T> ae) => ae.Add(ae.Lit(1), ae.Lit(2));
}

We use the same implementation as in the first code example but now add a new interface containing the functions over the type as well as a factory for the algebra. Notice that we now generate the expression in ExampleTwo.AddOneToTwo() using the ExpAlgebra<T> interface instead of directly from the types. We can now add a function by extending the ExpAlgebra<T> interface, we will add functionality to print the expression:

interface IPrintExp : IEvalExp
{
    string Print();
}

class PrintableLit : Lit, IPrintExp
{
    internal PrintableLit(int n) : base(n)
    {
        N = n;
    }

    internal int N { get; }

    public string Print()
    {
        return N.ToString();
    }
}

class PrintableAdd : Add, IPrintExp
{
    internal PrintableAdd(IPrintExp left, IPrintExp right) : base(left, right)
    {
        Left = left;
        Right = right;
    }

    internal new IPrintExp Left { get; }

    internal new IPrintExp Right { get; }

    public string Print()
    {
        return Left.Print() + " + " + Right.Print();
    }
}

class PrintFactory : ExpFactory, ExpAlgebra<IPrintExp>
{
    public IPrintExp Add(IPrintExp left, IPrintExp right)
    {
        return new PrintableAdd(left, right);
    }

    public new IPrintExp Lit(int n)
    {
        return new PrintableLit(n);
    }
}

static class ExampleThree
{
    internal static int Evaluate() => ExampleTwo<IPrintExp>.AddOneToTwo(new PrintFactory()).Eval();
    internal static string Print() => ExampleTwo<IPrintExp>.AddOneToTwo(new PrintFactory()).Print();
}

Notice that in ExampleThree.Print() we are printing an expression that was already compiled in ExampleTwo, we did not need to modify any existing code. Notice also that this is still strongly typed, we do not need reflection or casting. If we would replace the PrintFactory() with the ExpFactory() in the ExampleThree.Print() we would get a compilation error since the .Print() method does not exist in that context.

== See also ==
- Applications of FOSD program cubes
- Generic programming
- POPLmark challenge
