= Birger Hjørland =

- Born: 1 January 1947; Nærum
- Education: Department of Information Studies, University of Copenhagen, Holte Gymnasium, University of Gothenburg
- Scientific career
- Fields: knowledge organization
- Website: https://researchprofiles.ku.dk/en/persons/birger-hj%C3%B8rland/

Birger Hjørland (born January 1, 1947, in Denmark) is a professor of knowledge organization at the Royal School of Library and Information Science (RSLIS) in Copenhagen. His main areas of study pertain to theory of library and information science and of knowledge organization. Hjørland has contributed important developments to domain analysis and concept theory. He has been cited as an anchor of North American knowledge organization studies, as well as an information science pioneer.

Birger Hjørland started working at the RSLIS in 1976, then became a research librarian at The Royal Library in Copenhagen from 1978 to 1990. From 1990 he returned to RSLIS and became professor in 2001. He has done research and taught at RSLIS ever since. Many of his students have become research librarians or information specialists. He is a member of the editorial board of various journals and the editor-in-chief of the ISKO Encyclopedia of Knowledge Organization.

== Scientific work ==
Hjørland has emphasized in many papers that any work in library and information science cannot be "atheoretical", but should be based explicitly on some theoretical approach. He has classified four main approaches to LIS: empiricist, rationalistic, historical-hermeneutical and pragmatical, the last two of which he considers to be more valuable.

=== Domain analysis and concept theory ===
Hjørland's domain analysis is an attempt at a comprehensive theory that can be applied to information science. Its main premise is a set of analytical tools that can be applied in subsets or as a whole to in order to study the effects of different social, epistemological, and cultural fields on the theories of information science. Thus organization is applied in relation to the different domains from which it emanates and is consumed. Rather than studying the user in this case, the domain or environment is the main focus of the theory. Individuals are seen as members of distinct cultures or domains and their subsequent document systems.

Similar to domain analysis, concept theory aims to create a theory of concepts which may be applied to knowledge organization systems by analyzing conceptual semantic relationships. Different theories of concepts, i.e., how users interact with information, shape interaction with information in three specific aspects: bibliometrics, information literacy, and knowledge organization. This theory indicates that concepts are definitions of the world created according to one's inclinations and ideas; they cannot exist in isolation from the interests that created them. Hjørland argues that the theory is best understood through historicists and pragmatic interpretations, i.e., cultural (historical) influences on concepts best describe their meaning as well as pragmatic changes to concepts to allow humans to adapt and change certain concepts. Thus, concepts evolve with human practices.

Hjørland's work has been classified as social constructivism. Indeed, he cites own work in domain analysis as "socio-cognitive", that is, the study of the effects of a culture on individuals, and their information artifacts.

=== Wikipedia ===
In recent years, Hjørland has done research on Wikipedia as a part of establishing an information science-grounded kind of source criticism. He has written research articles about the reliability of Wikipedia. In one of them, he compares a Wikipedia article about a breast cancer controversy to an article in Encyclopædia Britannica and two Danish encyclopedias. As a part of the research, Hjørland has edited Wikipedia himself, making contributions to several articles related to information science.
