= FOSD origami =

Feature-oriented programming or feature-oriented software development (FOSD) is a general paradigm for program synthesis in software product lines. The feature-oriented programming page is recommended, it explains how an FOSD model of a domain is a tuple of 0-ary functions (called values) and a set of 1-ary (unary) functions called features. This page discusses multidimensional generalizations of FOSD models, which are important for compact specifications of complex programs.

== Origami ==
A fundamental generalization of metamodels is origami. The essential idea is that a program's design need not be represented by a single expression; multiple expressions can be used. This involves the use of multiple orthogonal GenVoca models.

Example: Let T be a tool model, which has features P (parse), H (harvest), D (doclet), and J (translate to Java). P is a value and the rest are unary-functions. A tool T1 that parses a file written in a Java dialect language and translates it to pure Java is modeled by: T1 = J•P. And a javadoc-like tool T2 parses a file in a Java dialect, harvests comments, and translates harvested comments into an HTML page is: T2 = D•H•P. So tools T1 and T2 are among the products of the product line of T.

A language model L describes a family (product line) of Java dialects. It includes the features: B (Java 1.4), G (generics), S (State machines). B is a value, and the rest are unary functions. So a dialect of Java L1 that has generics (i.e., Java 1.5) is: L1 = G•B. And a dialect of Java L2 that has language support for state machines is: L2 = S•B. So dialects L1 and L2 are among the products of the product line of L.

To describe a javadoc like tool (E) for the dialect of Java with state machines requires two expressions: one that defines the tool functionality for E (using the T model) and its Java dialect (using the L model):

  E = D•H•P    -- tool equation
  E = S•B      -- language equation

Models L and T are orthogonal GenVoca models: one expresses the feature-based structure of the E tool, and the other the feature-based structure of its input language. Note that models T and L really are abstract in the following sense: the implementation of any feature of T really depends on the tool's dialect (expressed by L), and (symmetrically) the implementation of any feature of L really depends on the tool's functionality (expressed by T). So the only way one could implement E is by knowing both T and L equations.

Let {{{1}}} be a GenVoca model of n features, and {{{1}}} be a GenVoca model of m features. The relationship between two orthogonal models U and W is a matrix UW, called an Origami matrix, where each row corresponds to a feature in U and each column corresponds to a feature in W. Entry UW_{ij} is a function that implements the combination of features U_{i} and W_{j}.

Note: UW is the tensor product of U and W (i.e., UW=U×W).

$$UW = U \times W
= \begin{bmatrix}
UW_{11} & UW_{12} & \cdots & UW_{1n} \\
\vdots & \vdots & \ddots & \vdots \\
UW_{m1} & UW_{m2} & \cdots & UW_{mn}
\end{bmatrix}$$

Example. Recall models T=[P,H,D,J] and L=[B,G,S]. The Origami matrix TL is:

$$TL = T \times L
= \begin{bmatrix}
PB & PG & PS \\
HB & HG & HS \\
DB & DG & DS \\
JB & JG & JS
\end{bmatrix}$$

where PB is a value that implements a parser for Java, PG is a unary-function that extends a Java parser to parse generics, and PS is a unary-function that extends a Java parser to parse state machine specifications. HB is a unary-function that implements a harvester of comments on Java code. HG is a unary-function that implements a harvester of comments on generic code, and HS is a unary-function that implements a harvester of comments on state machine specifications, and so on.

To see how multiple equations are used to synthesize a program, again consider models U and W. A program F is described by two equations, one per model. We can write an equation for F in two different ways: referencing features by name or by their index position, such as:

$F = U_1 \cdot U_2 \cdot U_4 = \sum_{i=1,2,4} U_i$ — U expression of F

$F = W_1 \cdot W_3 = \sum_{j=1,3} W_i$ — W expression of F

The UW model defines how models U and W are implemented. Synthesizing program F involves projecting UW of unneeded columns and rows, and aggregating (a.k.a. tensor contraction):

$$F = UW_{11} \cdot UW_{21} \cdot ... \cdot UW_{33} = \sum_{i=1,2,3} \sum_{j=1,3} UW_{i,j} = \sum_{j=1,3} \sum_{i=1,2,3} UW_{i,j}$$

A fundamental property of origami matrices, called orthogonality, is that the order in which dimensions are contracted does not matter. In the above equation, summing across the U dimension (index i) first or the W dimension (index j) first does not matter. Of course, orthogonality is a property that must be verified. Efficient (linear) algorithms have been developed to verify that origami matrices (or tensors/n-dimensional arrays) are orthogonal. The significance of orthogonality is one of view consistency. Aggregating (contracting) along a particular dimension offers a 'view' of a program. Different views should be consistent: if one repairs the program's code in one view (or proves properties about a program in one view), the correctness of those repairs or properties should hold in all views.

In general, a product of a product line may be represented by n expressions, from n orthogonal and abstract GenVoca models G_{1} ... G_{n}. The Origami matrix (or cube or tensor) is an n-dimensional array A:

$$A =  G_1 \times ... \times G_n =  \prod_{k=1}^n G_k$$

A product H of this product line is formed by eliminating unnecessary rows, columns, etc. from A, and aggregating (contracting) the n-cube into a scalar:

$$H =  \sum_{i_1} \sum_{i_2} ... \sum_{i_n} G_{i_1,i_2...i_n}$$

Example. Recall program E and model T=[P,H,D,J]. E=D•H•P=T_{2}•T_{1}•T_{0}. Similarly, E's representation in model L=[B,G,S] is E=S•B=L_{2}•L_{0}. Synthesizing E given Origami model TL is evaluating the following expression: $E = \sum_{i=2,0} \sum_{j=2,0} TL_{i,j} = \sum_{j=2,0} \sum_{i=2,0} TL_{i,j}$.

== Applications ==
There are several of product line applications developed using Origami. Among them include:

- AHEAD Tool Suite and Extensible Java Preprocessors
- Expression Problem or the Extensibility Problem
- Refinements and Multi-Dimensional Separation of Concerns

More applications to be supplied.

== See also ==
- Feature-oriented programming
- FOSD metamodels
