= Symposium on Principles of Programming Languages =

Academic conference in the field of computer science

The annual ACM SIGPLAN-SIGACT Symposium on Principles of Programming Languages (POPL) is an academic conference in the field of computer science, with focus on fundamental principles in the design, definition, analysis, and implementation of programming languages, programming systems, and programming interfaces. The venue is jointly sponsored by two Special Interest Groups of the Association for Computing Machinery: SIGPLAN and SIGACT.

POPL ranks as A* (top 4%) in the CORE conference ranking.

The proceedings of the conference are hosted at the ACM Digital Library. They were initially under a paywall, but since 2017 they are published in open access as part of the journal Proceedings of the ACM on Programming Languages (PACMPL).

== Affiliated events ==
- Declarative Aspects of Multicore Programming (DAMP)
- Foundations and Developments of Object-Oriented Languages (FOOL/WOOD)
- Partial Evaluation and Semantics-Based Program Manipulation (PEPM)
- Practical Applications of Declarative Languages (PADL)
- Programming Language Technologies for XML (PLAN-X)
- Types in Language Design and Implementation (TLDI)
- Verification, Model Checking and Abstract Interpretation (VMCAI)
- Languages for Inference (LAFI)

== See also ==
- International Conference on Functional Programming (ICFP)
- Programming Language Design and Implementation (PLDI)
- POPLmark challenge
