= FOSD Mixin Layers =

The key implementation technique of GenVoca is due to Smaragdakis called mixin-layers.

Aspectual mixin layers and aspectual feature modules are recent extensions that incorporate aspect-oriented programming.

== See also ==
- Feature-oriented programming
