= Virtual product development =

Development of products in a digital environment

Virtual product development (VPD) is the practice of developing and prototyping products in a completely digital 2D/3D environment. VPD has four main components:

- virtual product design (3D shape, 2D graphics/copy)
- virtual product simulation (drop test, crush test, etc.)
- virtual product staging (retail space planning, consumer research and behavior analysis)
- digital manufacturing (process planning, assembly/filling virtualization, plant design).

VPD typically takes place in a collaborative, web-based environment that brings together designers, customers/consumers, and value chain partners around a single source of real-time product "truth". VPD enables practitioners to arrive at the right idea more quickly, and to accurately predict its performance in both manufacturing and retail settings, ultimately minimizing time to value, market failure potential, and product development costs.

Virtual process planning is a relatively new concept for manufacturing companies, although the concept has been in use for the construction industry for several years. BIM (building information modeling) is the system used by many construction, architectural and contracting firms. The detail and scheduling aspects are some of the more valuable aspects of the system. By utilizing virtual process planning, the entire production process can be designed to both maximize efficiency and avoid the trial and error method employed by most manufacturers.

Various software exists with differing levels of information. The placement of work stations, inventory, personnel and equipment can be valuable for space planning. The interaction of the previously mentioned can also be investigated, allowing the user to identify potential issues from safety, quality and ergonomic standpoints.

VPD is a result of constant efforts in a direction to overcome the limitations of conventional testing procedures. VPD allows a designer to take important design decisions at early stages based on test results, giving control over cost. ‘Virtual product development’ is a strategy for coordinating technology, processes and people to enhance the established product development process. It is a gradual process that efficiently builds up a product virtually. Thus any changes to be made in its design can be reflected into its physical properties, supply chain, distribution channel and ultimately into the customer view; without physically manufacturing the product.

An early adopter of VPD in the early 2000's was the U.S. Army's Tank-Automotive Research, Development, and Engineering Center (TARDEC) in Warren, Michigan. Working with Army vehicle development and production programs, TARDEC used its Advanced Collaborative Environment (ACE) to tailor and accelerate vehicle design, integration, production, and testing efforts. Notably, the Computer Aided Virtual Environment was used by the Brigade Combat Team program (later called the Stryker program) to develop and implement soldier-based design changes from CAVE design evaluations that were incorporated into vehicles in production without impacting the production schedule.

VPD encompasses a wide variety of software tools to cover a product from the conception to the final design and even manufacturing. This path consists of various processes to be carried out at manufacturing level, testing procedures and the final design which is modified automatically based on the test results. One of the major advantages of VPD is its computer brain capability, which can simulate various complex load conditions at a time. Non-linear load conditions are not always possible to create at the testing centre where the prototypes are being tested in conventional testing methods. These complex conditions, if accommodated during testing, can yield more reliable product form.

Innovation World’s Product Design Technologies section explores how AI, 3D printing, AR/VR, and smart manufacturing are transforming modern product development. It emphasizes faster prototyping, sustainable innovation, and automation. Key trends include user-centered design and intelligent systems that streamline production workflows.

== Notes ==
- Patent (WO 2000009230 A1) by Mattel, Inc:- Vehicle having impact-responsive crash simulation.
- "The birth of the virtual car: how hardware-in0the-loop is revolutionizing product design at General Motor and Ford Company", Edward C. Jennings, 1999
- "Virtual product development- the engine for successful enterprises", Dr. Christopher St John.
- "Virtual product development tools- innovation and risk management: part 2", Leslie Rickey.
- "Virtual product development tools will shorten time to market", Michael L. Bussler.
- "Speed product development with integrated digital mock up solutions", Dassault systems PLM
