= Axiomatic design =

Systems design methodology

Axiomatic design is a systems design methodology using matrix methods to systematically analyze the transformation of customer needs into functional requirements, design parameters, and process variables. Specifically, a set of functional requirements(FRs) are related to a set of design parameters (DPs) by a Design Matrix A:

$$\begin{bmatrix} FR_1 \\ FR_2 \end{bmatrix} = \begin{bmatrix} A_{11} & A_{12} \\ A_{21} & A_{22} \end{bmatrix} \begin{bmatrix} DP_1 \\ DP_2 \end{bmatrix}$$

The method gets its name from its use of design principles or design Axioms (i.e., given without proof) governing the analysis and decision making process in developing high quality product or system designs. The two axioms used in Axiomatic Design (AD) are:

- Axiom 1: The Independence Axiom. Maintain the independence of the functional requirements (FRs).
- Axiom 2: The Information Axiom. Minimize the information content of the design.

Axiomatic design is considered to be a design method that addresses fundamental issues in Taguchi methods.

Coupling is the term Axiomatic Design uses to describe a lack of independence between the FRs of the system as determined by the DPs. I.e., if varying one DP has a resulting significant impact on two separate FRs, it is said the FRs are coupled. Axiomatic Design introduces matrix analysis of the Design Matrix to both assess and mitigate the effects of coupling.

Axiom 2, the Information Axiom, provides a metric of the probability that a specific DP will deliver the functional performance required to satisfy the FR. The metric is normalized to be summed up for the entire system being modeled. Systems with less functional performance risk (minimal information content) are preferred over alternative systems with higher information content.

The methodology was developed by Dr. Suh Nam Pyo at MIT, Department of Mechanical Engineering since the 1990s. A series of academic conferences have been held to present current developments of the methodology.

== See also ==
- Design structure matrix (DSM)
- New product development (NPD)
- Design for Six Sigma
- Six Sigma
- Taguchi methods
- Axiomatic product development lifecycle (APDL)
- C-K theory
