= Domain analysis =

In software engineering, domain analysis, or product line analysis, is the process of analyzing related software systems in a domain to find their common and variable parts. It is a model of wider business context for the system. The term was coined in the early 1980s by James Neighbors. Domain analysis is the first phase of domain engineering. It is a key method for realizing systematic software reuse.

Domain analysis produces domain models using methodologies such as domain specific languages, feature tables, facet tables, facet templates, and generic architectures, which describe all of the systems in a domain. Several methodologies for domain analysis have been proposed.

The products, or "artifacts", of a domain analysis are sometimes object-oriented models (e.g. represented with the Unified Modeling Language (UML)) or data models represented with entity-relationship diagrams (ERD). Software developers can use these models as a basis for the implementation of software architectures and applications. This approach to domain analysis is sometimes called model-driven engineering.

In information science, the term "domain analysis" was suggested in 1995 by Birger Hjørland and H. Albrechtsen.

== Domain analysis techniques ==
Several domain analysis techniques have been identified, proposed and developed due to the diversity of goals, domains, and involved processes.

- DARE: Domain Analysis and Reuse Environment ,
- Feature-Oriented Domain Analysis (FODA)
- IDEF0 for Domain Analysis
- Model Oriented Domain Analysis and Engineering

== See also ==
- Domain engineering
- Domain-specific language
- Feature Model
- Model-driven engineering
- Product Family Engineering
