= Product design =

Process of development of new products

Product design is the process of creating new products for businesses to sell to their customers. It involves the generation and development of ideas through a systematic process that leads to the creation of innovative products. Thus, it is a major aspect of new product development.

The product design process is a set of strategic and tactical activities, from idea generation to commercialization, used to create a product design. In a systematic approach, product designers conceptualize and evaluate ideas, turning them into tangible inventions and products. The product designer's role is to combine art, science, and technology to create new products that people can use. Their evolving role has been facilitated by digital tools that now allow designers to do things that include communicate, visualize, analyze, 3D modeling, and actually produce tangible ideas in a way that would have taken greater human resources in the past.

Product design is sometimes confused with (and certainly overlaps with) industrial design, and has recently become a broad term inclusive of service, software, and physical product design. Industrial design is concerned with bringing artistic form and usability, usually associated with craft design and ergonomics, together in order to mass-produce goods. Other aspects of product design and industrial design include engineering design, particularly when matters of functionality or utility (e.g. problem-solving) are at issue, though such boundaries are not always clear.

== Product design process ==
There are various product design processes and many focus on different aspects. One example formulation/model of the process is described by Don Koberg and Jim Bagnel in "The Seven Universal Stages of Creative Problem-Solving." The process is usually completed by a group of people with different skills and training—e.g. industrial designers, field experts (prospective users), engineers (for engineering design aspects), depending upon the nature and type of the product involved. The process often involves figuring out what is required, brainstorming possible ideas, creating mock prototypes and then generating the product. However, that is not the end. Product designers would still need to execute the idea, making it into an actual product and evaluating its success (seeing if any improvements are necessary).

The product design process has experienced huge leaps in evolution over the last few years with the rise and adoption of 3D printing. New consumer-friendly 3D printers can produce dimensional objects and print upwards with a plastic-like substance, as opposed to traditional printers that spread ink across a page.

The product design process, as expressed by Koberg and Bagnell, typically involves three main aspects: analysis, concept, and synthesis.

Depending on the kind of product being designed, the latter two sections are most often revisited (e.g. depending on how often the design needs revision, to improve it or to better fit the criteria). This is a continuous loop, where feedback is the main component. Koberg and Bagnell offer more specifics on the process: In their model, "analysis" consists of two stages, "concept" is only one stage, and "synthesis" encompasses the other four. (These terms notably vary in usage in different design frameworks. Here, they are used in the way they are used by Koberg and Bagnell.)

=== Analysis ===
- Accept situation: Here, the designers decide on committing to the project and finding a solution to the problem. They pool their resources into figuring out how to solve the task most efficiently.
- Analyze: In this stage, everyone in the team begins research. They gather general and specific materials which will help to figure out how their problem might be solved. This can range from statistics and questionnaires to published articles, among many other sources.

=== Concept ===
- Define: This is where the key issue of the matter is defined. The conditions of the problem become objectives, and restraints on the situation become the parameters within which the new design must be constructed.

=== Synthesis ===
- Ideate: The designers here brainstorm different ideas, solutions for their design problem. The ideal brainstorming session does not involve any bias or judgment, but instead builds on original ideas.
- Select: By now, the designers have narrowed down their ideas to a select few, which can be guaranteed successes and from there they can outline their plan to make the product.
- Implement: This is where the prototypes are built, the plan outlined in the previous step is realized and the product starts to become an actual object.
- Evaluate: In the last stage, the product is tested, and from there, improvements are made. Although this is the last stage, it does not mean that the process is over. The finished prototype may not work as well as hoped so new ideas need to be brainstormed.

== Double diamond framework ==
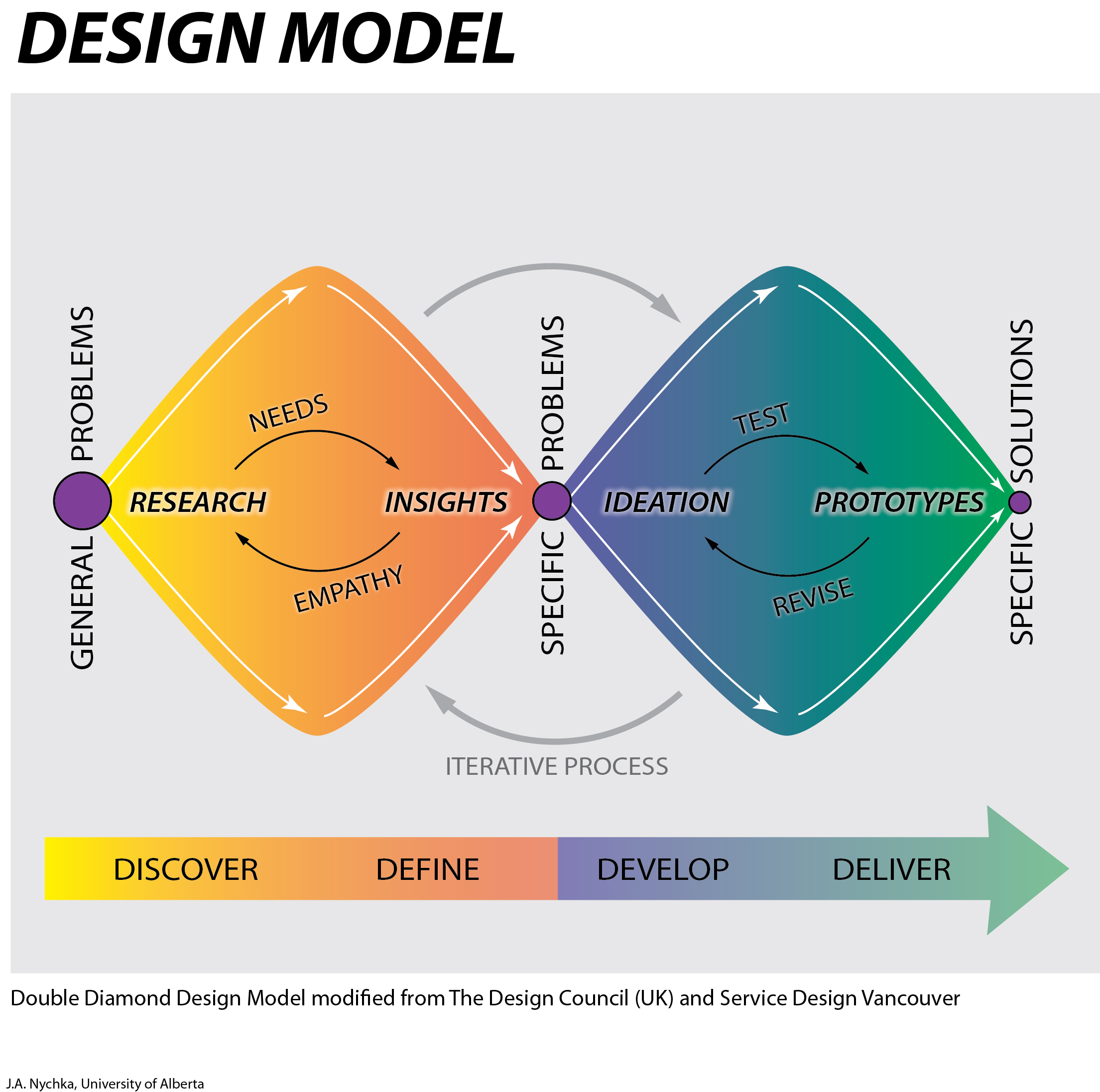
Visualization of double diamond model

The double diamond framework is a widely used approach for product discovery, which emphasizes a structured method for problem-solving and solution development, encouraging teams to diverge (broad exploration) before converging (focused decision-making).

The framework is divided into two primary stages: diverging and converging, each with its own steps and considerations.

Diverging stage:

During the diverging stage, teams explore the problem space broadly without predefined solutions. This phase involves engaging with core personas, conducting open-ended conversations, and gathering unfiltered input from customer-facing teams. The goal is to identify and document various problem areas, allowing themes and key issues to emerge naturally.

Converging stage:

As insights emerge, teams transition to the converging stage, where they narrow down problem areas and prioritize solutions. This phase involves defining the problem, understanding major pain points, and advocating for solutions within the organization. Effective convergence requires clear articulation of the problem's significance and consideration of business strategies and feasibility.

Iterative process:

The double diamond framework is iterative, allowing teams to revisit stages as needed based on feedback and outcomes. Moving back to earlier stages may be necessary if solutions fail to address underlying issues or elicit negative user responses. Success lies in the team's ability to adapt and refine their approach over time.

== Creative visualization ==
In design, creative visualization refers to the process by which computer generated imagery, digital animation, three-dimensional models, and two-dimensional representations, such as architectural blueprints, engineering drawings, and sewing patterns are created and used in order to visualize a potential product prior to production. Such products include prototypes for vehicles in automotive engineering, apparel in the fashion industry, and buildings in architectural design.

== Demand-pull innovation and invention-push innovation ==
Most product designs fall under one of two categories: demand-pull innovation or invention-push innovation.

Demand-pull happens when there is an opportunity in the market to be explored by the design of a product. This product design attempts to solve a design problem. The design solution may be the development of a new product or developing a product that's already on the market, such as developing an existing invention for another purpose.

Invention-push innovation happens when there is an advancement in intelligence. This can occur through research or it can occur when the product designer comes up with a new product design idea.

== Product design expression ==
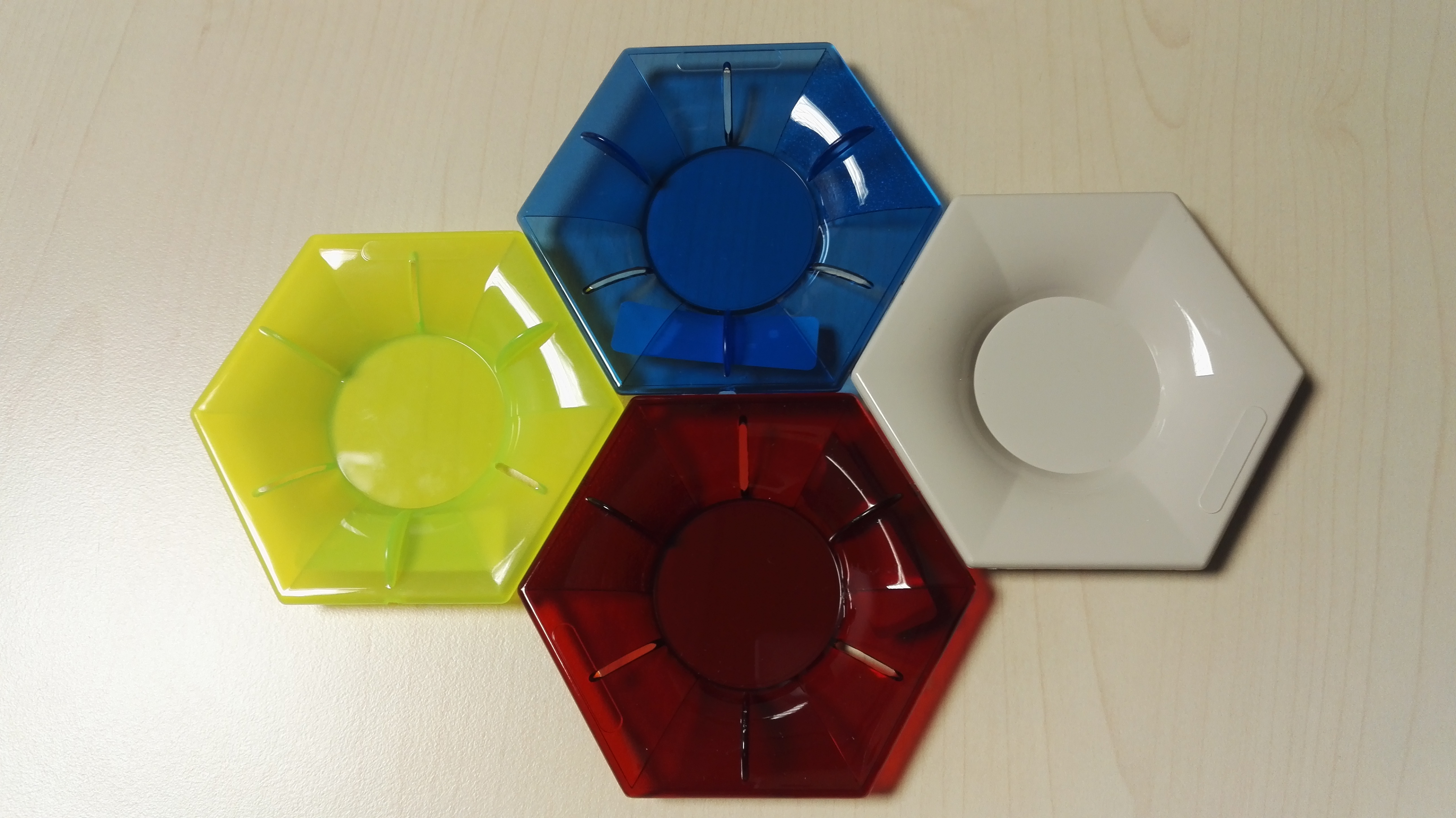
So-called "color chips" or color samples, used in the plastic industry to help designers visually identify available colors of plastic pellets

Design expression comes from the combined effect of all elements in a product. Color tone, shape and size should direct a person's thoughts towards buying the product. Therefore, it is in the product designer's best interest to consider the audiences who are most likely to be the product's end consumers. Keeping in mind how consumers will perceive the product during the design process will contribute to the product's success in the market. However, even within a specific audience, it is challenging to cater to each possible personality within that group.

One solution to that is to create a product that, in its designed appearance and function, expresses a personality or tells a story. Products that carry such attributes are more likely to give off a stronger expression that will attract more consumers. It is also important to note that design expression does not only concern the appearance of a product but also its function. For example, just as both visual design and product functionality affect user perception, both aspects must be carefully aligned when they are making a first impression on us. People usually do not appreciate a rude person even if they are good-looking. Similarly, a product can have an attractive appearance but if its function does not follow through it will most likely drop in regard to consumer interest. In this sense, designers are like communicators; they use the language of different elements in the product to express something.

== Trends in product design ==
Product designers must consider every detail: how people use and misuse objects, potential flaws in products, errors in the design process, and the ideal ways people wish they could interact with those objects. Many new designs will fail and many won't even make it to market. Some designs eventually become obsolete. The design process itself can be quite frustrating usually taking 5 or 6 tries to get the product design right. A product that fails in the marketplace the first time may be re-introduced to the market 2 more times. If it continues to fail, the product is then considered to be dead because the market believes it to be a failure. Most new products fail, even if there's a great idea behind them.

All types of product design are linked to the economic health of manufacturing sectors. Innovation provides much of the competitive impetus for developing new products, with new technology often requiring a new design interpretation. It only takes one manufacturer to create a new product paradigm to force the rest of the industry to catch up—fueling further innovation. Products designed to benefit people of all ages and abilities—without penalty to any group—accommodates swelling and aging populations by extending independence and supporting the changing physical and sensory needs that are encountered in these groups.

== See also ==
- Axiomatic product development lifecycle (APDL)
- Industrial design
- Sustainable design
- Transgenerational design
- Virtual product development
- Universal design
- Inclusive design
