= Knowledge engineer =

A knowledge engineer is a professional engaged in the science of building advanced logic into computer systems in order to try to simulate human decision-making and high-level cognitive tasks. A knowledge engineer supplies some or all of the "knowledge" that is eventually built into the technology.

== Overview ==
Often, knowledge engineers are intermediaries employed to translate highly technical information which they elicit from domain experts into the actual computer program or data system (ESDG 2000).

Knowledge engineers interpret and organize information on how to make systems decisions (Aylett & Doniat 2002).

The term "knowledge engineer" first appeared in the 1980s in the first wave of commercialization of AI – the purpose of the job is to work with a client who wants an expert system created for them or their business.

== Validation and verification ==
Knowledge engineers are involved with validation and verification.

Validation is the process of ensuring that something is correct or conforms to a certain standard. A knowledge engineer is required to carry out data collection and data entry, but they must use validation in order to ensure that the data they collect, and then enter into their systems, fall within the accepted boundaries of the application collecting the data.

It is important that a knowledge engineer incorporates validation procedures into their systems within the program code. After the knowledge-based system is constructed, it can be maintained by the domain expert (Bultman, Kuipers & van Harmelen 2000).
