= Business Controls Corporation =

Business Controls Corporation is a privately held computer company that developed an application-program-generator and also a series of accounting software packages. These packages were widely enough used for various business magazines to have back-of-the-book ads for companies seeking accountants with experience in one or more of them.

Computer magazines ran coverage for their SB-5 application-program-generator as from time to time new versions were released, each with new or improved features.

== Early days ==
The company's initial offerings were packages for the DEC PDP-8, although Business Controls Corporation also wrote custom-written programs for customers.

Large customers with mainframes who also used smaller systems for departmental use and distributed processing also used BCC's services.

== SB-5 ==
The addition of an application-program-generator named SB-5 that, from specifications, could generate COBOL code was a major step forward. Although this began with supporting the DEC PDP-11, they subsequently began to support COBOL on DEC's DECsystem-10 & DECSYSTEM-20. VAX support came later.

The specifications also permitted COBOL inserts and overrides: SB-5 could build an application that was all COBOL, yet only code the portions that varied from BCC's "vanilla" accounting packages.

=== Similar offerings ===
A similar idea was done for the IBM mainframe world in the form of a series of application-program-generators from Dylakor Corporation. They were named DYL-250, DYL-260, DYL-270 & DYL-280. Dylakor was acquired by Computer Associates.

The specific syntax was different, but it had wider use, and - a mark of success and recognition in the industry - syntax-compatible implementations were released by a competitor.

Still another alternative was Peat Marwick Mitchell's PMM2170 application-program-generator package. Like the others, it supported COBOL inserts and overrides.

=== Extended integration ===
Business Controls Corporation subsequently extended SB-5's feature set to provide support for System 1022, a product for the DECsystem-10 & DECSYSTEM-20; 1022's vendor also had a VAX/VMS (later OpenVMS) product, System 1032.
