= Feature model =

Model in software development

In software development, a feature model is a compact representation of all the products of the Software Product Line (SPL) in terms of "features". Feature models are visually represented by means of feature diagrams. Feature models are widely used during the whole product line development process and are commonly used as input to produce other assets such as documents, architecture definition, or pieces of code.

A SPL is a family of related programs. When the units of program construction are features—increments in program functionality or development—every program in an SPL is identified by a unique and legal combination of features, and vice versa.

Feature models were first introduced in the Feature-Oriented Domain Analysis (FODA) method by Kang in 1990. Since then, feature modeling has been widely adopted by the software product line community and a number of extensions have been proposed.

== Background ==
A "feature" is defined as a "prominent or distinctive user-visible aspect, quality, or characteristic of a software system or system". The focus of SPL development is on the systematic and efficient creation of similar programs. FODA is an analysis devoted to identification of features in a domain to be covered by a particular SPL.

=== Model ===
A feature model is a model that defines features and their dependencies, typically in the form of a feature diagram + left-over (a.k.a. cross-tree) constraints. But also it could be as a table of possible combinations.

=== Diagram ===
A feature diagram is a visual notation of a feature model, which is basically an and-or tree. Other extensions exist: cardinalities, feature cloning, feature attributes, discussed below.

=== Configuration ===
A feature configuration is a set of features that describes a member of an SPL: the member contains a feature if and only if the feature is in its configuration. A feature configuration is permitted by a feature model if and only if it does not violate constraints imposed by the model...

=== Feature Tree ===
A Feature Tree (sometimes also known as a Feature Model or Feature Diagram) is a hierarchical diagram that visually depicts the features of a solution in groups of increasing levels of detail. Feature Trees are great ways to summarize the features that will be included in a solution and how they are related in a simple visual manner.

== Feature modeling notations ==
Current feature modeling notations may be divided into three main groups, namely:

- Basic feature models
- Cardinality-based feature models
- Extended feature models

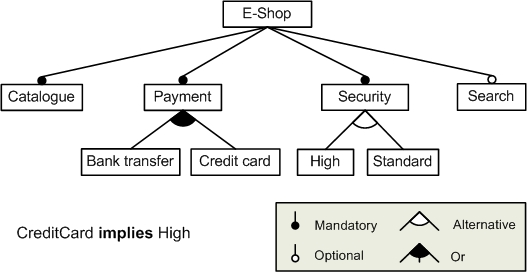
A feature diagram representing a configurable e-shop system

=== Basic feature models ===
Relationships between a parent feature and its child features (or sub-features) are categorized as:

- Mandatory – child feature must be selected.
- Optional – child feature can be selected or not selected.
- Or – at least one of the sub-features must be selected.
- Alternative (xor) – exactly one of the sub-features must be selected.

In addition to the parental relationships between features, cross-tree constraints are allowed. The most common are:

- A requires B – The selection of A in a product implies the selection of B.
- A excludes B – A and B cannot be part of the same product.

As an example, the figure to the right illustrates how feature models can be used to specify and build configurable on-line shopping systems. The software of each application is determined by the features that it provides. The root feature (i.e. E-Shop) identifies the SPL. Every shopping system implements a catalogue, payment modules, security policies and optionally a search tool. E-shops must implement a high or standard security policy (choose one), and can provide different payment modules: bank transfer, credit card or both of them. Additionally, a cross-tree constraint forces shopping systems including the credit card payment module to implement a high security policy.

=== Cardinality-based feature models ===
Some authors propose extending basic feature models with UML-like multiplicities of the form [n,m] with n being the lower bound and m the upper bound. These are used to limit the number of sub-features that can be part of a product whenever the parent is selected.

If the upper bound is * the feature can be cloned as many times as we want (as long as the other constraints are respected). This notation is useful for products extensible with an arbitrary number of components.

=== Extended feature models ===
Others suggest adding extra-functional information to the features using "attributes". These are mainly composed of a name, a domain, and a value.

== Semantics ==
The semantics of a feature model is the set of feature configurations that the feature model permits. The most common approach is to use mathematical logic to capture the semantics of a feature diagram. Each feature corresponds to a boolean variable and the semantics is captured as a propositional formula. The satisfying valuations of this formula correspond to the feature configurations permitted by the feature diagram. For instance, if $f_1$ is a mandatory sub-feature of $f_2$, the formula will contain the constraint $f_1 \Leftrightarrow f_2$.

The following table provides a translation of the basic primitives. We assume that the diagram is a rooted tree with root $r$. The semantics of a whole diagram is a conjunct of the translations of the elements contained in the diagram. Therefore, in case all elements are written in Conjunctive normal form (CNF), then the terms can easily be combined with logical AND and the whole logical expression will remain in CNF.

Feature Diagram Primitive	Semantics	Semantics in Conjunctive normal form
$r$ is the root feature	$r$	$r$
$f_1$ mandatory sub-feature of $f$	$f_1 \Leftrightarrow f$	$(f_1 \lor \lnot f) \land (\lnot f_1 \lor f)$
$f_1$ optional sub-feature of $f$	$f_1 \Rightarrow f$	$(\lnot f_1 \lor f)$
$f_1,\dots,f_n$ or sub-features of $f$	$f_1 \lor \dots \lor f_n \Leftrightarrow f$	$( f_1 \lor \dots \lor f_n \lor \lnot f ) \land \bigwedge_{i=1 \dots n} ( \lnot f_i \lor f )$
$f_1,\dots,f_n$ alternative (xor) sub-features of $f$	$\left(f_1 \lor \dots \lor f_n \Leftrightarrow f\right) \land \bigwedge_{i<j}\lnot(f_i \land f_j)$	$( f_1 \lor \dots \lor f_n \lor \lnot f ) \land \bigwedge_{i=1 \dots n} ( \lnot f_i \lor f ) \land \bigwedge_{i<j} ( \lnot f_i \lor \lnot f_j )$
$f_1$ requires $f_2$	$f_1 \Rightarrow f_2$	$(\lnot f_1 \lor f_2)$
$f_1$ excludes $f_2$	$\lnot (f_1 \land f_2)$	$(\lnot f_1 \lor \lnot f_2)$

== Configuring products ==
A product of the SPL is declaratively specified by selecting or deselecting features according to user's preferences. Such decisions must respect the constraints imposed by the feature model. A "configurator" is a tool that assists the user during a configuration process. For instance by automatically selecting or deselecting features that must or must not, respectively, be selected for the configuration to be completed successfully. Current approaches use unit propagation and CSP solvers.

== Properties and analyses ==
An analysis of a feature model targets certain properties of the model which are important for marketing strategies or technical decisions. A number of analyses are identified in the literature. Typical analyses determine whether a feature model is void (represents no products), whether it contains dead features (features that cannot be part of any product), or the number of products of the software product line represented by the model. Other analyses focus on comparing several feature models (e.g. to check whether a model is a specialization or refactoring or generalization of another).

== See also ==
- Domain analysis
- Domain engineering
- Feature-oriented Programming - a paradigm for software product line synthesis
- Product Family Engineering
- Software Product Lines
