= Agent-oriented software engineering =

Software

Agent-oriented software engineering (AOSE) is a software engineering paradigm that arose to apply best practice in the development of complex Multi-Agent Systems (MAS) by focusing on the use of agents, and organizations (communities) of agents as the main abstractions. The field of Software Product Lines (SPL) covers all the software development lifecycle necessary to develop a family of products where the derivation of concrete products is made systematically and rapidly.

== Benchmarks ==
Several benchmarks have been developed to evaluate the capabilities of AI coding agents and large language models in software engineering tasks. Here are some of the key benchmarks:

Agentic software engineering benchmarks
| Benchmark | Description |
|---|---|
| SWE-bench | Assesses the ability of AI models to solve real-world software engineering issues sourced from GitHub repositories. The benchmark involves: Providing agents with a code repository and issue description; Challenging them to generate a patch that resolves the described problem; Evaluating the generated patch against unit tests |
| ML-Agent-Bench | Designed to evaluate AI agent performance on machine learning tasks |
| τ-Bench | τ-Bench is a benchmark developed by Sierra AI to evaluate AI agent performance and reliability in real-world settings. It focuses on: Testing agents on complex tasks with dynamic user and tool interactions; Assessing the ability to follow domain-specific policies; Measuring consistency and reliability at scale |
| WebArena | Evaluates AI agents in a simulated web environment. The benchmark tasks include: Navigating complex websites to complete user-driven tasks; Extracting relevant information from the web; Testing the adaptability of agents to diverse web-based challenges |
| AgentBench | A benchmark designed to assess the capabilities of AI agents in handling multi-agent coordination tasks. The key areas of evaluation include: Communication and cooperation between agents; Task efficiency and resource management; Adaptability in dynamic environments |
| MMLU-Redux | An enhanced version of the MMLU benchmark, focusing on evaluating AI models across a broad range of academic subjects and domains. It measures: Subject matter expertise across multiple disciplines; Ability to handle complex problem-solving tasks; Consistency in providing accurate answers across topics |
| McEval | A coding benchmark designed to test AI models' ability to solve coding challenges. The benchmark evaluates: Code correctness and efficiency; Ability to handle diverse programming languages; Performance across different coding paradigms and tasks |
| CS-Bench | A specialized benchmark for evaluating AI performance in computer science-related tasks. The key focus areas include: Algorithms and data structures; Computational complexity and optimization; Theoretical and applied computer science concepts |
| WildBench | Tests AI models in understanding and reasoning about real-world wild environments. It emphasizes: Handling noisy and unstructured data; Adapting to unpredictable changes in the environment; Performing well in multi-modal scenarios with real-world relevance |
| Test of Time | A benchmark that focuses on evaluating AI models' ability to reason about temporal sequences and events over time. It assesses: Understanding of temporal logic and sequence prediction; Ability to make decisions based on time-dependent data; Performance in tasks requiring long-term planning and foresight |

== Software engineering agent systems ==
There are several software engineering (SWE) agent systems in development. Here are some examples:

List of SWE Agent Systems
| SWE Agent System | Backend LLM |
|---|---|
| Salesforce Research DEIBASE-1 | gpt4o |
| Cosine Genie | Fine-tuned OpenAI GPT |
| CodeStory Aide | gpt4o + Claude 3.5 Sonnet |
| AbenteAI MentatBot | gpt4o |
| Salesforce Research DEIBASE-2 | gpt4o |
| Salesforce Research DEI-Open | gpt4o |
| Bytedance MarsCode | gpt4o |
| Alibaba Lingma | gpt-4-1106-preview |
| Factory Code Droid | Anthropic + OpenAI |
| AutoCodeRover | gpt4o |
| Amazon Q Developer | (unknown) |
| CodeR | gpt-4-1106-preview |
| MASAI | (unknown) |
| SIMA | gpt4o |
| Agentless | gpt4o |
| Moatless Tools | Claude 3.5 Sonnet |
| IBM Research Agent | (unknown) |
| Aider | gpt4o + Claude 3 Opus |
| OpenDevin + CodeAct | gpt4o |
| AgileCoder | (various) |
| ChatDev | (unknown) |
| MetaGPT | gpt4o |
