= Steven D. Eppinger =

American engineer (born 1961)

Steven D. Eppinger (born 1961) is an American engineer, and Professor of Management, Professor of Management Science and Innovation, and Professor of Engineering Systems at Massachusetts Institute of Technology, known for his work on product design and product development.

== Biography ==
Eppinger studied mechanical engineering at MIT, where he received his Bachelor of Science, his Master of Science in 1988, and his Doctor of Science in 1993.

After obtaining his master's degree in 1988 he became Assistant Professor at MIT, where he was later appointed Professor in the field of Management, in Management Science and Innovation, and in Engineering Systems. At MIT, Eppinger also directed its Center for Innovation in Product Development, co-directed LGO/SDM programs, and from 2004 to 2007 was deputy dean of the MIT Sloan School of Management.

After graduation in 1993, he was awarded the Graduate Student Council Teaching Award from MIT, and the Award for Innovation and Excellence in Management Education from the MIT Sloan School of Management. In 1995 and in 2001 he obtained the ASME Best Paper Award in Design Theory and Methodology.

== Selected publications ==
Eppinger authored and co-authored many publications in the field of product design and development and is a highly cited author in the field. A selection of his books.

- Pimmler, Thomas Udo, and Steven D. Eppinger. Integration analysis of product decompositions. Cambridge, MA: Alfred P. Sloan School of Management, Massachusetts Institute of Technology, 1994,
- Ulrich, Karl T., and Steven D. Eppinger. Product design and development. Vol. 384. New York: McGraw-Hill, 1995, 2000, 2004, 2008,

Articles, a selection:

- Eppinger, S. D., Whitney, D. E., Smith, R. P., & Gebala, D. A. (1994). "A model-based method for organizing tasks in product development." Research in Engineering Design, 6(1), 1-13.
- Krishnan, Viswanathan, Steven D. Eppinger, and Daniel E. Whitney. "A model-based framework to overlap product development activities." Management science 43.4 (1997): 437-451.
- Smith, Robert P., and Steven D. Eppinger. "Identifying controlling features of engineering design iteration." Management Science 43.3 (1997): 276-293.
