= Design knowledge =

Principles invoked in design research

There is a large body of knowledge that designers call upon and use during the design process to match the ever-increasing complexity of design problems. Design knowledge can be classified into two categories: product knowledge and design process knowledge.

== Product Knowledge ==
Product knowledge has been fairly studied and a number of modeling techniques have been developed. Most of them are tailored to specific products or specific aspects of the design activities. For example, geometric modeling is used mainly for supporting detailed design, while knowledge modeling is working for supporting conceptual designs. Based on these techniques, a design repository project at NIST attempts to model three fundamental facets of an artifact representation: the physical layout of the artifact (form), an indication of the overall effect that the artifact creates (function), and a causal account of the operation of the artifact (behavior). The recent NIST research effort towards the development of the basic foundations of the next generation of CAD systems suggested a core representation for design information called the NIST core product model (CPM) and a set of derived models defined as extensions of the CPM (e.g.). The NIST core product model has been developed to unify and integrate product or assembly information. The CPM provides a base-level product model that is: not tied to any vendor software; open; non-proprietary; expandable; independent of any one product development process; capable of capturing the engineering context that is most commonly shared in product development activities. The core model focuses on artifact representation including function, form, behavior, material, physical and functional decompositions, and relationships among these concepts. The entity–relationship data model influences the model heavily; accordingly, it consists of two sets of classes, called object and relationship, equivalent to the UML class and association class, respectively.

== Design Process Knowledge ==
Design process knowledge can be described in two levels: design activities and design rationale. The importance of representation for design rationale has been recognized but it is a more complex issue that extends beyond artifact function. The design structure matrix (DSM) has been used for modeling design process (activities) and some related research efforts have been conducted. For example, a web-based prototype system for modeling the product development process using a multi-tiered DSM is developed at MIT. However, few research endeavors have been found on design rationale.

== Representation Scenarios ==
In terms of representation scenarios, design knowledge can also be categorized into off-line and on-line knowledge. Design process knowledge can be categorized into ontologies.

=== Off-line Knowledge ===
Offline Knowledge refers to existing knowledge representation, including design knowledge in handbook and design ‘‘know-how’’, etc.; the latter refers to the new design knowledge created in the course of design activities by designers themselves. For the off-line knowledge, there are two representation approaches. One is to highly abstract and categorize existing knowledge including experiences into a series of design principles, rationales and constraints. TRIZ is a good instance of this approach. The other is to represent a collection of design knowledge into a certain case for description. Case-based design is an example of this approach. The key issue is on the computerization of the design knowledge representation. For instance, researchers at the Engineering Design Centre at Lancaster University, UK established a unique knowledge representation methodology and knowledge base vocabulary based on the theory of domains, design principles and computer modeling. They developed a software tool for engineering knowledge management. The tool provides an engineering system designer with the capability to search a knowledge base of past solutions, and other known technologies to explored viable alternatives for product design.

=== On-line Knowledge ===
On-line knowledge representation is capturing the dynamic design knowledge in a certain format for design re-use and archive. A few research efforts have been found in this area. Blessing proposes the process-based support system (PROSUS) based on a model of the design process rather than the product. It uses a design matrix to represent the design process as a structured set of issues and activities. Together with the common product data model (CPDM), PROSUS supports the capture of all outputs of the design activity.

=== Ontologies ===
Ontologies are being used for product representation (e.g.). Research suggests that there is a need to provide computer support that will supply clear and complete design knowledge and also facilitate designer intervention and customization during the decision-making activities in the design process. For example, WebCADET is a design support system that uses distributed Web-based AI tools. It uses the AI as text approach, where knowledge-based systems (KBSs) can be seen as a medium to facilitate the communication of design knowledge between designers. The system can provide support for designers when searching for design knowledge.
