= Meta-process modeling =

Type of metamodeling

Abstraction level for processes.

Meta-process modeling is a type of metamodeling used in software engineering and systems engineering for the analysis and construction of models applicable and useful to some predefined problems.

Meta-process modeling supports the effort of creating flexible process models. The purpose of process models is to document and communicate processes and to enhance the reuse of processes. Thus, processes can be better taught and executed. Results of using meta-process models are an increased productivity of process engineers and an improved quality of the models they produce.

== Overview ==
Meta-process modeling focuses on and supports the process of constructing process models. Its main concern is to improve process models and to make them evolve, which in turn, will support the development of systems. This is important due to the fact that "processes change with time and so do the process models underlying them. Thus, new processes and models may have to be built and existing ones improved". "The focus has been to increase the level of formality of process models in order to make possible their enactment in process-centred software environments".

A process meta-model is a meta model, "a description at the type level of a process model. A process model is, thus, an instantiation of a process meta-model. [..] A meta-model can be instantiated several times in order to define various process models. A process meta-model is at the meta-type level with respect to a process."

There exist standards for several domains:

- Software engineering
- Software Process Engineering Metamodel (SPEM) which is defined as a profile (UML) by the Object Management Group.

== Topics in metadata modeling ==
There are different techniques for constructing process models. "Construction techniques used in the information systems area have developed independently of those in software engineering. In information systems, construction techniques exploit the notion of a meta-model and the two principal techniques used are those of instantiation and assembly. In software engineering the main construction technique used today is language-based. However, early techniques in both, information systems and software engineering were based on the experience of process engineers and were, therefore, ad hoc in nature."

=== Ad hoc ===
"Traditional process models are expressions of the experiences of their developers. Since this experience is not formalised and is, consequently, not available as a fund of knowledge, it can be said that these process models are the result of an ad hoc construction technique. This has two major consequences: it is not possible to know how these process models were generated, and they become dependent on the domain of experience. If process models are to be domain independent and if they are to be rapidly generable and modifiable, then we need to go away from experience based process model construction. Clearly, generation and modifiability relate to the process management policy adopted (see Usage World). Instantiation and assembly, by promoting modularization, facilitate the capitalisation of good practice and the improvement of given process models."

=== Assembly ===
The assembly technique is based on the idea of a process repository from which process components can be selected. Rolland (1998) lists two selection strategies:

1. Promoting a global analysis of the project on hand based on contingency criteria (Example Van Slooten 1996)
2. Using the notion of descriptors as a means to describe process chunks. This eases the retrieval of components meeting the requirements of the user / matching with the situation at hand. (Example Plihon 1995 in NATURE and repository of scenario based approaches accessible on Internet in the CREWS project)

For the assembly technique to be successful, it is necessary that process models are modular. If the assembly technique is combined with the instantiation technique then the meta-model must itself be modular.

=== Instantiation ===
For reusing processes a meta-process model identifies "the common, generic features of process models and represents them in a system of concepts. Such a representation has the potential to 'generate' all process models that share these features. This potential is realised when a generation technique is defined whose application results in the desired process model."

Process models are then derived from the process meta-models through instantiation. Rolland associates a number of advantages with the instantiation approach:

1. The exploitation of the meta-model helps to define a wide range of process models.
2. It makes the activity of defining process models systematic and versatile.
3. It forces to look for and introduce, in the process meta-model, generic solutions to problems and this makes the derived process models inherit the solution characteristics.

"The instantiation technique has been used, for example, in NATURE, Rolland 1993, Rolland 1994, and Rolland 1996. The process engineer must define the instances of contexts and relationships that comprise the process model of interest."

=== Language ===
Rolland (1998) lists numerous languages for expressing process models used by the software engineering community:

- E3
- Various Prolog dialects for EPOS, Oikos, and PEACE
- PS-Algol for PWI

as well as further computational paradigms:

- Petri nets in EPOS and SPADE
- Rule based paradigm in MERLIN
- ALF
- Marvel
- EPOS
- Triggers in ADELE and MVP-L.

Languages are typically related to process programs whereas instantiation techniques have been used to construct process scripts.

=== Tool support ===
The meta-modeling process is often supported through software tools, called CAME tools (Computer Aided Method Engineering) or MetaCASE tools (Meta-level Computer Assisted Software Engineering tools). Often the instantiation technique "has been utilised to build the repository of Computer Aided Method Engineering environments".

Example tools for meta-process modeling are:

- Maestro II
- MetaEdit+
- Mentor

== Example: "Multi-model view" ==
Colette Rolland (1999) provides an example of a meta-process model which utilizes the instantiation and assembly technique. In the paper the approach is called "Multi-model view" and was applied on the CREWS-L'Ecritoire method. The CREWS-L'Ecritoire method represents a methodical approach for Requirements Engineering, "the part of the IS development that involves investigating problems and requirements of the users community and developing a specification of the future system, the so-called conceptual schema.".

Besides the CREWS-L'Ecritoire approach, the multi-model view has served as a basis for representing:

(a) the three other requirements engineering approaches developed within the CREWS project, Real World Scenes approach, SAVRE approach for scenario exceptions discovery, and the scenario animation approach
(b) for integrating approaches one with the other and with the OOSE approach

Furthermore, the CREWS-L'Ecritoire utilizes process models and meta-process models in order to achieve flexibility for the situation at hand. The approach is based on the notion of a labelled graph of intentions and strategies called a map as well as its associated guidelines. Together, map (process model) and the guidelines form the method. The main source of this explanation is the elaboration of Rolland.

=== Process model / map ===
The map is "a navigational structure which supports the dynamic selection of the intention to be achieved next and the appropriate strategy to achieve it"; it is "a process model in which a nondeterministic ordering of intentions and strategies has been included. It is a labelled directed graph with intentions as nodes and strategies as edges between intentions. The directed nature of the graph shows which intentions can follow which one."

The map of the CREWS-L'Ecritoire method looks as follow:

Process model of the CREWS-L'Ecritoire method

The map consists of goals / intentions (marked with ovals) which are connected by strategies (symbolized through arrows). An intention is a goal, an objective that the application engineer has in mind at a given point of time. A strategy is an approach, a manner to achieve an intention. The connection of two goals with a strategy is also called section.

A map "allows the application engineer to determine a path from Start intention to Stop intention. The map contains a finite number of paths, each of them prescribing a way to develop the product, i.e. each of them is a process model. Therefore the map is a multi-model. It embodies several process models, providing a multi-model view for modeling a class of processes. None of the finite set of models included in the map is recommended 'a priori'. Instead the approach suggests a dynamic construction of the actual path by navigating in the map. In this sense the approach is sensitive to the specific situations as they arise in the process. The next intention and strategy to achieve it are selected dynamically by the application engineer among the several possible ones offered by the map. Furthermore, the approach is meant to allow the dynamic adjunction of a path in the map, i.e. adding a new strategy or a new section in the actual course of the process. In such a case guidelines that make available all choices open to handle a given situation are of great convenience. The map is associated to such guidelines".

=== Guidelines ===
A guideline "helps in the operationalisation of the selected intention"; it is "a set of indications on how to proceed to achieve an objective or perform an activity." The description of the guidelines is based on the NATURE project's contextual approach and its corresponding enactment mechanism. Three types of guidelines can be distinguished:

- Intention Selection Guidelines (ISG) identify the set of intentions that can be achieved in the next step and selects the corresponding set of either IAGs (only one choice for an intention) or SSGs (several possible intentions).
- Strategy Selection Guidelines (SSG) guide the selection of a strategy, thereby leading to the selection of the corresponding IAG.
- Intention Achievement Guidelines (IAG) aim at supporting the application engineer in the achievement of an intention according to a strategy, are concerned with the tactics to implement these strategies, might offer several tactics, and thus may contain alternative operational ways to fulfil the intention.

Example of an Intention Selection Guideline 1 (ISG-1)

Example of a Strategy Selection Guideline 1 (SSG-1)

Example of an Intention Achievement Guideline 8 (IAG-8)

In our case, the following guidelines – which correspond with the map displayed above – need to be defined:

Intention Selection Guidelines (ISG)

1. ISG-1 Progress from Elicit a goal
2. ISG-2 Progress from Conceptualize a Scenario
3. ISG-3 Progress from Write a scenario
4. ISG-4 Progress from Start

Strategy Selection Guidelines (SSG)

1. SSG-1 Progress to Elicit a goal
2. SSG-2 Progress to Conceptualize a Scenario
3. SSG-3 Progress to Write a scenario
4. SSG-4 Progress to Elicit a goal
5. SSG-5 Progress to Stop

Intention Achievement Guidelines (IAG)

1. IAG-1 Elicit a goal with case-based strategy
2. IAG-2 Elicit a goal with composition strategy
3. IAG-3 Elicit a goal with alternative strategy
4. IAG-4 Elicit a goal with refinement strategy
5. IAG-5 Elicit a goal with linguistic strategy
6. IAG-6 Elicit a goal with template-driven strategy
7. IAG-7 Write a scenario with template-driven strategy
8. IAG-8 Write a scenario in free prose
9. IAG-9 Conceptualize a Scenario with computer support strategy
10. IAG-10 Conceptualize a Scenario manually
11. IAG-11 Stop with completeness strategy

The following graph displays the details for the Intention Achievement Guideline 8 (IAG-8).

=== Meta-process map ===
In the multi-model view as presented in the paper of C. Rolland, the meta-process (the instance of the meta-process model) is "a process for the generation of a path from the map and its instantaneous enactment for the application at hand." While the meta-process model can be represented in many different ways, a map was chosen again as a means to do so. It is not to be mixed up with the map for the process model as presented above.

Meta-process model of the CREWS-L'Ecritoire method

Colette Rolland describes the meta-model as follows: (Meta-intentions are in bold, meta-strategies in italic – in green in the map.)

"The Start meta-intention starts the construction of a process by selecting a section in the method map which has map intention Start as source. The Choose Section meta-intention results in the selection of a method map section. The Enact Section meta-intention causes the execution of the method map section resulting from Choose Section. Finally, the Stop meta-intention stops the construction of the application process. This happens when the Enact Section meta-intention leads to the enactment of the method map section having Stop as the target. As already explained in the previous sections, there are two ways in which a section of a method map can be selected, namely by selecting an intention or by selecting a strategy. Therefore, the meta-intention Choose Section has two meta-strategies associated with it, select intention and select strategy respectively. Once a method map section has been selected by Choose Section, the IAG to support its enactment must be retrieved; this is represented in [the graph] by associating the meta-strategy automated support with the meta-intention, Enact Section."

== Sample process ==
The sample process "Eliciting requirements of a Recycling Machine" is about a method for designing the requirements of recycling facilities. The recycling facilities are meant for customers of a supermarket. The adequate method is obtained through instantiation of the meta-process model on the process model.

The following table displays the stepwise trace of the process to elicit requirements for the recycling machine (from ):

Step	Guideline	Meta-process	Process	Product (Goal = Gxx)
1.1	SSG-4	Choose section with select strategy	SSG4 suggests two strategies. The template-driven strategy is chosen because it is the most appropriate way to become familiar with the goal formalisation proposed by the CREWS-L'Ecritoire method	
1.2	IAG-6	Enact section with automated support	IAG6 displays a goal statement template and explains the meaning of each parameter. The requirement Engineer (RE) chooses a loose statement having only a verb and a target	G1: Provideverb (Recycling Facilities*) target *RF
2.1	ISG-1	Choose section with select intention	ISG1 provides RE with arguments to advise him on choosing one of the two possible intentions from Elicit a Goal, namely to Elicit a Goal or to Write a Scenario. The former is selected so as to generate alternative design solutions	
2.2	IAG-1	Enact section with automated support	IAG1 uses the goal statement structure and parameter values supplied to generate alternative goals. This leads to 21 alternative goals to G1 which are ORed to G1. After discussion with stakeholders, G4 is selected	G2: Provide bottle RF to our customers with a card-based machine; G3: Provide paper RF to our customers with a card-based machine; G4: Provide bottle and box RR to our customers with a card-based machine; . . . G22: Provide bottle RF to all customers with money return machine
3.1	SSG-3	Choose section with select strategy	SSG3 offers two strategies from which the template-driven strategy is chosen. This is because there is uncertainty about what a scenario should be. The templates lead to some certainty	
3.2	IAG-7	Enact section with automated support	IAG7 proposes a template to be filled in. The template corresponds to a service scenario and contains actions that express services expected from the system	SC4: If the customer gets a card, he recycles objects
4.1	SSG-2	Choose section with select strategy	SSG2 offers two strategies to conceptualise a Scenario. Among the two strategies, manual and computer based, the former is chosen since the service scenario (SC4) is very simple and can be handled manually	
4.2	IAG-10	Enact section with automated support	IAG10 suggests two things: (1) to avoid anaphoric references such as he, she, etc. (2) to express atomic actions in an explicit ordering (3) to avoid ambiguities The scenario is rewritten accordingly	SC4: 1. The customer gets a card; 2. The customer recycles boxes and bottles
5.1	SSG-1	Choose section with select strategy	The RE knows that he wants to analyse the scenario SC4 to discover a new goal. Thus, he knows the target intention 'Elicit a Goal' and SSG1 is displayed. SSG1 offers three strategies to discover new goals from scenario analysis. The refinement strategy, is chosen because there is a need to discover the functional requirements of recycling machine	
5.2	IAG-4	Enact section with automated support	IAG4 guides in transforming actions of the service scenario SC4 into goals which express functional requirements. Two goals are generated and related together to G4 with an AND relationship. G24 is selected for further processing	G23: Get card from supermarket; G24: Recycle bottles and boxes from RM
6.1	SSG-3	Choose section with select strategy	The RE knows his target intention, namely 'Write a Scenario'. Thus SSG3 is displayed to help the RE in selecting the right strategy. The free prose strategy is selected because the text is likely to be long and the free prose facilitates this	
6.2	IAG-8	Enact section with automated support	IAG8 provides style and contents guidelines adapted to the type of scenario at hand, namely system interaction scenario	SC24-1: The customer inserts his card in the RM. The RM checks if the card is valid and then a prompt is given. The customer inputs the bottles and/or boxes in the RM. If the objects are not blocked, the RM ejects the card and prints a receipt
7.1	SSG-2	Choose section with select strategy	SSG2 is displayed. The automated support strategy is selected to take advantage of the powerful linguistic devices and obtain a scenario formulation which will be the basis for automated reasoning	
7.2	IAG-9	Enact section with automated support	IAG9 semi-automatically transforms the initial prose into a structured text whose semantics conform to the scenario model. The transformation includes disambiguation, completion and mapping onto the linguistic structures associated to the concepts of the scenario model. SC24-2 is the result of the transformation of SC24-1. (Underlined statements result of the transformation)	SC24-2: 1. The customer inserts the customer card in the RM, 2. The RM checks if the card is valid, 3. If the card is valid, 4. A prompt is given to the customer, 5. The customer inputs the bottles and the boxes in the RM, 6. The RM checks if the bottles and the boxes are not blocked, 7. If the bottles and the boxes are not blocked, 8. The RM ejects the card to the customer, 9. The RM prints a receipt to the customer
8.1	SSG-1	Choose section with select strategy	Of the three strategies proposed by SSG1, the alternative discovery strategy is chosen. This strategy suits the need to investigate variations and exceptions of the normal course of actions described in SC242	
8.2	IAG-3	Enact section with automated support	IAG3 proposes several tactics to discover alternative goals to G24. The one based on the analysis of conditions in the scenario is selected. This leads to discover G25 and G26	G25: Recycle box and bottles from RM with invalid card; G26: Recycle box and bottles with a deblocking phase

== See also ==
- Automatic programming
- Class-Responsibility-Collaboration card (CRC)
- Data mapping
- Data transformation
- Domain Specific Language (DSL)
- Domain-specific modeling (DSM)
- Eclipse (software)
- Generative programming (GP)
- Glossary of Unified Modeling Language terms
- KM3
- Language oriented programming (LOP)
- List of UML tools
- Metadata
- Meta-modeling technique
- Meta-Object Facility
- Method engineering
- Model Driven Engineering (MDE)
- Model Transformation Language (MTL)
- Model-based testing (MBT)
- Model-driven architecture (MDA)
- Modeling language
- Modeling perspectives
- Object Constraint Language (OCL)
- Object-oriented analysis and design (OOAD)
- MOF Queries/Views/Transformations (QVT)
- Semantic spectrum
- Semantic translation
- Software factory
- Transformation language (TL)
- UML tool
- Unified Modeling Language
- Vocabulary-based transformation
- XMI
- XML transformation language (XTL)
