= GReAT =

Model transformation language

Graph Rewriting and Transformation (GReAT) is a model transformation language (MTL) for Model Integrated Computing available in the GME environment. GReAT has a rich pattern specification sublanguage, a graph transformation sublanguage and a high level control-flow sublanguage. It has been designed to address the specific needs of the model transformation area. The GME environment is an example of a model-driven engineering (MDE) framework.

== See also ==
- ATLAS Transformation Language
- CoSMIC
- Domain Specific Language (DSL)
- Domain-specific modelling (DSM)
- Model-based testing (MBT)
- Meta-Object Facility
- Meta-modeling
- VIATRA
- XMI
- OCL
- QVT
