= Common warehouse metamodel =

Specification for modeling in data warehouse

The common warehouse metamodel (CWM) defines a specification for modeling metadata for relational, non-relational, multi-dimensional, and most other objects found in a data warehousing environment. The specification is released and owned by the Object Management Group, which also claims a trademark in the use of "CWM".

== Overview ==
The CWM specifies interfaces that can be used to enable interchange of warehouse and business intelligence metadata between warehouse tools, warehouse platforms and warehouse metadata repositories in distributed heterogeneous environments. CWM is based on three standards:

- UML – Unified Modeling Language, an OMG modeling standard
- MOF – Meta Object Facility, an OMG metamodeling and metadata repository standard
- XMI – XML Metadata Interchange, an OMG metadata interchange standard

CWM models enable users to trace the lineage of data – CWM provides objects that describe where the data came from and when and how the data was created. Instances of the metamodel are exchanged via XML Metadata Interchange (XMI) documents.

Initially, CWM contained a local definition for a data translation facility. It is not clear how the QVT final adopted specification will affect CWM.

== Support for the CWM ==
=== Submitters of CWM specification ===
While the Object Management Group owns the standard for CWM, some companies are considered co-submitters of the CWM specification. The following companies were listed as co-submitters to the v1.1 specification:

- IBM
- Unisys Corporation
- NCR Corporation
- Hyperion Solutions Corporation
- Oracle Corporation
- UBS
- Genesis Development Corporation
- Dimension EDI

=== Compliance with the CWM specification ===
Software vendors claiming CWM support differ in the degree to which they comply with CWM. Some were co-submitters of the specification, and are actively using the OMG trademark in marketing literature. Other vendors have expressed support for CWM or claim they have products that are "CWM-compliant."

Questions about compliance are addressed within the specification itself. Chapter 18 in both the 1.0 and 1.1 specification list required and optional compliance points.

The Object Management Group has a list of CWM implementations, but it is unclear how this list is maintained.

=== Interoperability of CWM tools ===
Compliance with the CWM specification does not guarantee tools from different vendors will integrate well, even when they are "CWM-compliant". The OMG addressed some of these issues by releasing patterns and best practices to correct these problems in a supplementary specification, CWM Metadata Interchange Patterns

== Vendors supporting CWM ==
=== CWM implementations identified by OMG ===
These vendors have been identified as having a CWM implementation or have active projects to support CWM.

- IBM
- Informatica produces Intelligence Data Platform with PowerCenter, a data integration tool with a metadata extension Enterprise Data Catalog (EDC) (metadata manager formerly known as SuperGlue is replacing by EDC). Informatica is one of the members of the OMG
- Oracle Corporation Oracle Warehouse Builder and Oracle SQL Developer Data Modeler (formerly known as IKAN CWM4ALL)
- Pentaho
- prudsys AG – XELOPES library for embedded data mining
- SAS SAS adheres to the Object Management Group's CWM as the interoperability and interchange standard. An alliance between SAS and Meta Integration Technology Inc. (MITI) enables SAS to provide bridges for sharing and exchanging metadata with more than 40 design tool and repository vendors

=== Other vendors supporting CWM ===
The following products or companies have claimed CWM support, but are not listed by OMG as having a CWM implementation. In some cases, the vendor may have implemented the v1.0 specification, which was replaced by the v1.1 specification. Refer to the software vendor to determine if the product is compliant with CWM or merely supports a subset of the required portions of the specification.

- Cognos, now a division of IBM, is listed as a supporter of CWM in the v1.1 specification. Cognos product literature claims support for "Common Warehouse Model (CWM)" but never mentions an actual OMG specification.
- Hyperion Solutions, now a division of Oracle Corporation
- InQuisient fully supports version 1.1 in its data repository.
- Pentaho Pentaho Open Source Business Intelligence Project has recently added "Pentaho Metadata" which supports CWM

== See also ==
- Data Warehouse
- Metadata
- Metadata registry
- Metadata standards
- Extensible Markup Language (XML)
- XML Metadata Interchange (XMI)
- Domain Specific Language (DSL)
- Domain-specific modeling (DSM)
- Model-based testing (MBT)
- Meta-modeling
- Unified Modeling Language (UML)
- ATLAS Transformation Language (ATL)
- Visual Automated Model Transformations (VIATRA) framework
- Object Constraint Language (OCL)
- Model Transformation Language (MTL)
- Meta-Object Facility (MOF)
- Query/View/Transformation (QVT) languages
