= KM3 =

Neutral computer language

KM3 or Kernel Meta Meta Model is a neutral computer language to write metamodels and to define Domain Specific Languages. KM3 has been defined at INRIA and is available under the Eclipse platform.

== Related Concepts ==
- Model-driven architecture (MDA is an OMG Trademark),
- Model Driven Engineering (MDE is not an OMG Trademark)
- Domain Specific Language (DSL)
- Domain-specific modelling (DSM)
- Model-based testing (MBT)
- Meta-modeling
- ATL
- XMI
- OCL
- MTL
- MOF
- Object-oriented analysis and design (OOAD)
- Kermeta
