= Object Constraint Language =

Declarative language

The Object Constraint Language (OCL) is a declarative language describing rules applying to Unified Modeling Language (UML) models developed at IBM and is now part of the UML standard. Initially, OCL was merely a formal specification language extension for UML. OCL may now be used with any Meta-Object Facility (MOF) Object Management Group (OMG) meta-model, including UML. The Object Constraint Language is a precise text language that provides constraint and object query expressions on any MOF model or meta-model that cannot otherwise be expressed by diagrammatic notation. OCL is a key component of the new OMG standard recommendation for transforming models, the Queries/Views/Transformations (QVT) specification.

== Description ==
OCL is a descendant of Syntropy, a second-generation object-oriented analysis and design method. The OCL 1.4 definition specified a constraint language. In OCL 2.0, the definition has been extended to include general object query language definitions.

OCL statements are constructed in four parts:

1. a context that defines the limited situation in which the statement is valid
2. a property that represents some characteristics of the context (e.g., if the context is a class, a property might be an attribute)
3. an operation (e.g., arithmetic, set-oriented) that manipulates or qualifies a property, and
4. keywords (e.g., if, then, else, and, or, not, implies) that are used to specify conditional expressions.

== Relation ==
=== OCL and UML ===
OCL supplements UML by providing expressions that have neither the ambiguities of natural language nor the inherent difficulty of using complex mathematics. OCL is also a navigation language for graph-based models.

=== OCL and MOF ===
OCL makes a Meta-Object Facility model more precise by associating assertions with its meta-elements.

=== OCL and QVT ===
Of particular importance to Model Driven Engineering (MDE) or model-driven architecture is the notion of Model transformation. The OMG has defined a specific standard for model transformation called MOF/QVT or in short QVT. Several model transformation languages like GReAT, VIATRA, or Tefkat are presently available, with different levels of compliance with the QVT standard. Many of these languages are built on top of OCL, which is the main part of the QVT-compliance.

== Alternatives ==
Being a rule-based validation language, Schematron may be considered an alternative to OCL. However, Schematron works for Extensible Markup Language (XML) trees while OCL makes it possible to navigate MOF-based models and meta-models (i.e. XML Metadata Interchange (XMI) trees). In other words, OCL relates to UML or MOF similarly to how Schematron relates to XML. (Note that Schematron uses XPath to navigate inside the XML trees.)
Being a model specification language permitting designers to decorate a model or a meta-model with side-effect-free annotations, OCL could be replaced by languages like Alloy. Automated OCL generation is in principle possible from natural language.

== Examples ==
Examples
| Constrainthi | OCL Equivalent |
|---|---|
| The age of a person is not negative. | context Person inv: self.age >=0 |
| A person is younger than its parents. | context Person inv: self.parents->forAll(p|p.age>self.age) |
| After a birthday, a person becomes one year older. | context Person::hasBirthday() post: self.age=self.age@pre+1 |
| A Person has 2 parents at max. | context Person inv: self.parents->size()<=2 |
| After somebody has a child, their child-set is not empty, and it is larger than before. | context Person::getsChild() post: self.childs->notEmpty() and self.childs->size() > self.childs@pre->size() |
| Only an adult can be owner of a car. | context Person inv: self.age<18 implies self.cars->isEmpty() |
| The first registration of a car can not be before it is built. | context Auto inv: self.registration>=self.constructionYear |
| Every Person that has a car has at least one car which is younger than the Person. | context Person inv: self.cars->notEmpty() implies self.cars->exists( c | Calendar.YEAR - c.constructionYear < self.age) |
| Nobody can be their own parent. | context Person inv: self.parents->excludes(self) |
| There's at least one Person which owns a car. | context Person inv: Person.allInstances()->exists(p | p.cars->size() > 0) |

== Extensions ==
Eclipse OCL extends Standard OCL with additional operators and a type for Maps. AgileUML extends Standard OCL with Map and Function types. These extensions are consistent with the map and function types present in modern programming languages such as Python and Swift.

== See also ==
- Computer model
- Data mapping
- Domain Specific Language (DSL)
- Domain-specific modelling (DSM)
- Eclipse GMT Project
- Gello Expression Language
- Glossary of Unified Modeling Language terms
- List of UML tools
- Meta-modeling
- Meta-modeling technique
- Meta-Object Facility (MOF)
- Metadata
- Model-based testing (MBT)
- Model-driven architecture (MDA)
- Model Driven Engineering (MDE)
- Model Transformation Language (MTL)
- Modeling language
- Modeling perspectives
- MOFM2T
- Object-oriented analysis and design (OOAD)
- MOF Queries/Views/Transformations (QVT)
- Semantic translation
- Transformation language (TL)
- UML tool
- Vocabulary-based transformation
- XMI
- XML transformation language (XTL)
