= Platform-specific model =

Model of a software or business system

A platform-specific model is a model of a software or business system that is linked to a specific technological platform (e.g. a specific programming language, operating system, document file format or database). Platform-specific models are indispensable for the actual implementation of a system.

For example, if a business needs to implement an online shop, then their software system will need to store different kinds of information: available goods, user info such as credit cards, etc. The designer might decide to use for this purpose an Oracle database. For this to work, the designer will need to express concepts (e.g. the concept of a user) in a relational model using the Oracle's SQL dialect. This Oracle's specific relational model is an example of a Platform-specific model.

In Model-driven architecture, a platform-specific model is where the design of the model is constructed with the intended execution-platform driving design choices.

== Related Concepts ==
- ATLAS Transformation Language (ATL)
- Domain Specific Language (DSL)
- Domain-specific modelling (DSM)
- Eclipse Modeling Framework (EMF)
- Generic Modeling Environment (GME)
- Graphical Modeling Framework (GMF)
- Meta-Object Facility (MOF)
- Meta-modeling
- Model-based testing (MBT)
- Model-driven architecture (MDA)
- Model Transformation Language (MTL)
- Object Constraint Language (OCL)
- Object-oriented analysis and design (OOAD)
- Visual Automated model Transformations VIATRA
- XML Metadata Interchange (XMI)
