= SmartQVT =

- Stable release: 0.1.4 (February 27, 2007; 18 years ago) [±]
- Written in: Java
- Available in: French
- Type: Software Development
- License: EPL
- Website: smartqvt.elibel.tm.fr (Offline)

SmartQVT is a unmaintained (since 2013) full Java open-source implementation of the QTV-Operational language which is dedicated to express model-to-model transformations. This tool compiles QVT transformations into Java programs to be able to run QVT transformations. The compiled Java programs are EMF-based applications. It is provided as Eclipse plug-ins running on top of the EMF metamodeling framework and is licensed under EPL.

== Components ==
SmartQVT contains 3 main components:

- a code editor: this component helps the user to write QVT code by highlighting key words.
- a parser: this component converts QVT code files into model representations of the QVT programs (abstract syntax).
- a compiler: this component converts model representations of the QVT program into executable Java programs.

== See also ==
- Meta-Object Facility (MOF): a language to write metamodels
- Model transformation language
- Model-driven architecture (MDA)
