= UML-RSDS =

Model-transformation language (software)

UML-RSDS is a lightweight model-driven engineering (MDE) and model transformation tool supporting the UML 2.5 class diagram notation and OCL 2.4 Object Constraint Language. It supports code-generation in multiple 3GLs: Java, C#, C++, Python, Go, Swift and ANSI C.

The toolset has been defined as an Eclipse project AgileUML under the modeling category.

The toolset originated from EPSRC-funded research at Imperial College and King's College London in the period 1996–2014. It was publicly released in 2010 and defined as an Eclipse project in 2019. It is now supported by AgileMDE Ltd: agilemde.co.uk.

One motivation of the tools has been to provide a means for general software practitioners to use MDE in a flexible manner, to support agile development using MDE. The tool has been applied to financial software development and to many different kinds of transformation problems, for example

== Language characteristics ==
The main specification notations in UML-RSDS are UML class diagrams and use cases, together with Object Constraint Language (OCL) expressions, used to define invariants and operation pre and post-conditions. Either a graphical or textual notation can be used for UML-RSDS specifications.

For example, a simple class specification could be written as:

class Person {
  attribute age: int;
  attribute name: String;

  operation birthday()
  pre: true
  post: age = age@pre + 1;
}

Transformations are defined as use cases together with constraints expressing how result data is derived from input data. Thus a declarative specification style similar to the QVT relations language is supported, but without the need to define additional syntax or language elements - only OCL is used. For example, to copy every person instance to a 'PersonRecord' with a 'data' attribute formed from the name and age, it is sufficient to write:

usecase copyPersons {
  Person::
    PersonRecord->exists( r | r.data = name + age )
}

Verification procedures have been defined for this style of transformation specification.

For more general software applications, procedural-style code using statements such as assignment (:=), loops (while, for), conditionals (if then else) and sequencing (;) can be used to define operation and usecase behaviour. These statements correspond to a text version of UML activity models

The version of OCL used is an extension of OCL version 2.4, with additional data types Map and Function, together with extended sets of operators for strings (such as regular expressions) and collections. These can be used to provide a representation for the semantics of reverse-engineered programs from languages such as Java or COBOL. In turn, the representations in UML/OCL can then be translated to other languages such as Swift or Python.

== Application and evaluation ==
UML-RSDS has been the subject of a number of independent reviews and comparative evaluations by the model-transformation research community, such as the following secondary reliable sources authored by researchers independent of the UML-RSDS development team, which highlight the characteristics of UML-RSDS which support transformation verification:

It is notable as one transformation language which supports the property of additivity, this means that the semantics of UML-RSDS specifications are compositional.

UML-RSDS has been used by several case study solutions in the Transformation Tool Contest (TTC), the leading model transformation venue for transformation evaluation. In particular, the UML-RSDS solution came 3rd in the TTC 2014 "Movie Database" case contest.

It has been used in education and research by a number of universities, in particular, King's College London (UK), the University of Isfahan (Iran), Texas A and M International University (USA), TU Darmstadt (Germany), Azarbaijan Shahid Madani University (Iran) and University of Waterloo (Canada).
