= Metadata publishing =

Metadata publishing is the process of making metadata data elements available to external users, both people and machines using a formal review process and a commitment to change control processes.

Metadata publishing is the foundation upon which advanced distributed computing functions are being built. But like building foundations, care must be taken in metadata publishing systems to ensure the structural integrity of the systems built on top of them.

== Definition of metadata publishing ==
Published metadata has the following characteristics:

1. Metadata structures available to the general public on a public web site or by a download
2. There is a documented review and approval process for adding or updating data elements to the system
3. New releases are made available without disturbing prior versions
4. A publishing organization that makes a commitment to change control process

== Benefits of metadata publishing ==
When classifying benefits of metadata publishing two groups are usually considered. External parties are usually consumers of information that are not part of the publishing organization. Internal parties are usually the various business units or departments within an organization.

=== Benefits to external parties ===
1. Allows external systems (both people and agents) to have a clear understanding of the semantics of data elements in a system
2. Allows third parties to build semantic maps between data models and import and export data between systems
3. Promotes service oriented architectures and allow horizontal sharing of information between traditional information silos
4. Allows systems to participate in accurately indexed and federated search processes

=== Benefits to internal parties ===
1. allows parties from diverse business units to agree on shared data definitions and separate department or function specific definitions
2. makes Extract, transform, load (ETL) operations more precise for data warehousing
3. allows user interface designers to access a common pool of screen and report header labels
4. promotion of model-driven architecture

== Objections to metadata publishing ==
- Organizations that publish their metadata could make it easier for unauthorized people to find sensitive data if they breach an organization's firewall
- Vendors that publish their metadata risk customers creating tools that could allow their customers to export their data from computer systems, therefore making it easier to migrate off of a vendor's system

== Core process in metadata publishing ==
The following are some of the core processes in metadata publishing

1. Gathering of metadata requirements
2. Selection of metadata registry and metadata publishing tools
3. Training of metadata concepts to project participants
4. Stakeholder group formation
5. Metadata harvesting
6. Glossary consolidation
7. Initial upper ontology construction (abstract data elements)
8. Draft data element loading
9. Data element review process
10. Publishing approved metadata elements in a variety of output formats (see below)
11. Creation and maintenance of versions and depreciation of unused or redundant data elements

== File format metadata publishing ==
Organizations that create applications that store data in file systems can also publish metadata definitions. One common way to perform this is to store application data in a compressed XML file format. The XML files can be uncompressed and validated against an external XML Schema. An example of this is done by the Open Source FreeMind tool.

== Metadata publishing formats ==
1. HTML - used for browsing a web site and indexing by text-based search engines
2. Web Ontology Language (OWL) - used by metadata search engines such as Swoogle
3. XML Metadata Interchange (XMI) - OMG standard for exchanging metadata
4. Common Warehouse Metamodel (CMW) - OMG standard for data warehouse metadata
5. Topic maps - an ISO standard for the representation and interchange of knowledge, with an emphasis on the findability of information.
6. KM3 or Kernel Meta Meta Model as used in the Metamodel Zoos. The AtlanticZoo is an open source library of more than 100 metamodels under EPL License. KM3 is a simple Domain Specific Language for specifying metamodels. A number of transformations are available to translate from KM3 to other notations like XMI.

== See also ==
- Bibliographic database
- Data governance
- metadata
- Semantic web
- Semantic technology
- Metadata registry
- ISO/IEC 11179
- Topic Maps
