= Kermeta =

Modeling and programming language

Kermeta is a modeling and programming language for metamodel engineering.

== History ==
The Kermeta language was initiated by Franck Fleurey in 2005 within the Triskell team of IRISA (gathering researchers of the INRIA, CNRS, INSA and the University of Rennes 1).

The Kermeta language borrows concepts from languages such as MOF, OCL and QVT, but also from BasicMTL, a model transformation language implemented in 2004 in the Triskell team by D. Vojtisek and F. Fondement. It is also inspired by the previous experience on MTL, the first transformation language created by Triskell, and by the Xion action language for UML.

The name Kermeta is an abbreviation for "Kernel Metamodeling" and reflects the fact that the language is conceived as a core for (meta-)modeling. The Breton language consonance of this name is an intentional reflection of the Triskell team's location in Brittany.

Kermeta, and its execution platform under Eclipse is currently available under its version 2.0.4 released in 2012. It is open-source, under the Eclipse Public License.

== Philosophy ==
Kermeta is a modeling and aspect oriented programming language. Its underlying metamodel conforms to the EMOF standard. It is designed to write programs which are also models, to write transformations of models (programs that transform a model into another), to write constraints on these models, and to execute them. The goal of this model approach is to bring an additional level of abstraction on top of the "object" level and thus to see a given system like a set of concepts (and instances of concepts) that form an explicitly coherent whole, which one will call a model.

Kermeta thus brings:

- all the concepts of EMOF used for the specifications of a model.
- a real concept of model, more precisely of model type (Jim Steel).
- a concrete syntax that fits well to model and metamodel writing.
- two paradigms: the object, and the model.
- a bridge towards the Eclipse ECore formalism

== Characteristics ==
The main characteristics of the Kermeta language are :

- imperative: traditional structures of control
- object-oriented: multiple inheritance, late binding
- model-oriented: first-class concepts of associations and composition
- aspect-oriented: integrate a simple but powerful weaver for simple meta-modeling tasks. Arbitrary complex weaving is achieved using a dedicated composer written in Kermeta. This allows programmers to extend existing metamodels. Especially in order to add behavior to them by weaving behavioral semantics (operational or translational).
- design by contract: operations support pre and post conditions, classes use invariants.
- functional: functions and first class lambda-expressions
- statically typed: genericity for the classes and the operations, function types...
- complete introspection: the complete model of the program is available during execution.

== Syntax ==
The curious reader will find further information on the Kermeta website.

== Example (Kermeta 1.4) ==
 package fsm;
 
 require kermeta
 
 using kermeta::standard
 
 class FSM
 {
    attribute ownedState : set State[0..*]#owningFSM
    reference initialState : State[1..1] 
    reference currentState : State 
 
    /**
     * Print the FSM on the standard output
     */
    operation printFSM() is do
        self.ownedState.each 
        { s | 
            stdio.writeln("State : " + s.name)
            s.outgoingTransition.each 
            { t | 
                stdio.writeln("  Transition : " + t.source.name + 
                "-(" + t.input + "/" + t.output + ")->" + t.target.name)
            }
        }
    end
 }
 
 class State {
    attribute name : String
    reference owningFSM : FSM#ownedState
    attribute outgoingTransition : set Transition[0..*]#source
    reference incomingTransition : set Transition[0..*]#target
    
    operation step(c : String) : String is do
        // Get the valid transitions
        var validTransitions : Collection<Transition> 
        validTransitions :=    outgoingTransition.select { t | t.input.equals(c) }
        // Check if there is one and only one valid transition
        if validTransitions.empty then raise "No Transition!" end
        if validTransitions.size > 1 then raise "Non Determinism" end
        // fire the transition
        result := validTransitions.one.fire
    end
 }
 
 class Transition 
 {
    reference source : State[1..1]#outgoingTransition
    reference target : State[1..1]#incomingTransition
    attribute output : String
    attribute input : String
    
    operation fire() : String is do
        // update FSM current state
        source.owningFSM.currentState := target
        result := output
    end
 }

== See also ==
- Model Driven Engineering
- Domain Specific Language
- Domain Specific Modelling
- Model-Based Testing
- Metamodeling
- OCL
- Model Transformation Language
- Meta-Object Facility
