= MOF Model to Text Transformation Language =

Specification of Object Management Group

MOF Model to Text Transformation Language (Mof2Text or MOFM2T) is an Object Management Group (OMG) specification for a model transformation language. Specifically, it can be used to express transformations which transform a model into text (M2T), for example a platform-specific model into source code or documentation. MOFM2T is one part of OMG's Model-driven architecture (MDA) and reuses many concepts of MOF, OMG's metamodeling architecture. Whereas MOFM2T is used for expressing M2T transformations, OMG's QVT is used for expressing M2M transformations.

== See also ==
- Model-driven engineering (MDE)
- Model Driven Architecture (MDA): OMG's vision of MDE
- Acceleo, an implementation of the MOFM2T standard.
