= OptimalJ =

Java development environment

Compuware OptimalJ was a model-driven development environment for Java.

OptimalJ was first released in 2001 and was then based on Sun Microsystems' open source NetBeans IDE. Since 2006 OptimalJ is based on the open source Eclipse IDE. OptimalJ was developed out of Compuware's Amsterdam offices by many of the development team responsible for the Uniface development suite.

OptimalJ is available in two editions:

- The Professional Edition is focused on simplifying Java EE development, by providing the capability to model a Java EE application, and then generate the application's code from the model via implementation patterns. First, a platform-independent model is made, which is then transformed via technology patterns to a platform-specific model.
- The Architecture Edition provides capabilities for metamodeling and for writing implementation and technology patterns, which can be used to extend the Professional Edition. Metamodels and patterns are bundled into software factories.

OptimalJ was generally regarded as a technically inferior and expensive development environment. Compuware found it difficult to gain market share amongst the Java development community with the Optimal suite of products.

Due to internal restructurings, Compuware decided in 2008 to discontinue OptimalJ.
