= Transformation language =

A transformation language is a computer language designed to transform some input text in a certain formal language into a modified output text that meets some specific goal.

Program transformation systems such as Stratego/XT, TXL, Tom, DMS, and ASF+SDF all have transformation languages as a major component. The transformation languages for these systems are driven by declarative descriptions of the structure of the input text (typically a grammar), allowing them to be applied to wide variety of formal languages and documents.

Macro languages are a kind of transformation languages to transform a meta language into specific higher programming language like Java, C++, Fortran or into lower-level Assembly language.

In the model-driven engineering technical space, there are model transformation languages (MTLs), that take as input models conforming to a given metamodel and produce as output models conforming to a different metamodel. An example of such a language is the QVT OMG standard.

There are also low-level languages such as the Lx family implemented by the bootstrapping method. The L0 language may be considered as assembler for transformation languages. There is also a high-level graphical language built on upon Lx called MOLA.

There are a number of XML transformation languages. These include Tritium, XSLT, XQuery, STX, FXT, XDuce, CDuce, HaXml, XMLambda, and FleXML.

== See also ==
Concepts:

- bidirectional transformation
- data conversion
- data element
- data mapping
- data migration
- data transformation
- metadata
- model transformation
- graph transformation
- refinement (contrast)

Languages and typical transforms:

- ATL
- AWK (tabular data transforms)
- Identity transform
- QVT
- TXL (general)
- XQuery (XML)
- XSLT (XML)
