= General-purpose modeling =

General-purpose modeling (GPM) is the systematic use of a general-purpose modeling language to represent the various facets of an object or a system. Examples of GPM languages are:

- The Unified Modeling Language (UML), an industry standard for modeling software-intensive systems
- EXPRESS, a data modeling language for product data, standardized as ISO 10303-11
- IDEF, a group of languages from the 1970s that aimed to be neutral, generic and reusable
- Gellish, an industry standard natural language oriented modeling language for storage and exchange of data and knowledge, published in 2005

GPM languages are in contrast with domain-specific modeling languages (DSMs).

== See also ==
- Model-driven engineering (MDE)
