= Dually =

Dually may refer to:

- Dualla, County Tipperary, a village in Ireland
- A pickup truck with dual wheels on the rear axle
- DUALLy, s platform for architectural languages interoperability
- Dual-processor

== See also ==
- Dual (disambiguation)
