= OGML =

Ontology Grounded Metalanguage (OGML) is a metalanguage like MOF. The goal of OGML is to tackle the difficulties of MOF: linear modeling architecture, ambiguous constructs and incomprehensible/unclear architecture.

OGML provides a nested modeling architecture with three fixed layers (models, languages and metalanguage). Therefore, it is clear how the different models conform to each other and can be handled. Constructs in OGML are chosen from the science of ontology, making the distinction between properties / objects and classes / objects very clear. This commitment makes explicit certain oddities of the definition of, for example, relations.

Furthermore, OGML provides an explicit notion of instantiation: model elements encode their types and languages define the semantics of instantiation. This extra information is needed in the relative modeling architecture to distinguish between structural and conceptual views on models, for example: we may want to view a UML model as an instance of the object language and an instance of the Class model (Clabject). By providing this dual view on the metamodel layer and on the language layer, OGML provides a very precise modeling architecture and an expressive way to deal with models.
