= Model-driven integration =

In software design, model-driven integration is a subset of model-driven architecture (MDA) which focuses purely on solving Application Integration problems using executable Unified Modeling Language (UML).
