= Powertype (UML) =

Programming language keyword

In the Unified Modeling Language 1.x, powertype is a keyword for a specific UML stereotype, and applies to a class or dependency. Powertype shows a classifier whose instances (objects) are children of the given parent.

In UML 2.x, a powertype is a metaclass whose instances are subclasses of a given class. The stereotype has been removed and the powertype is now indicated by typing the generalization set.

In the UML Superstructure 2.4.1 Specification Document the following definition is given:

The notion of power type was inspired by the notion of power set. A power set is defined as a set whose instances are subsets. In essence, then, a power type is a class whose instances are subclasses.

In UML 2.5.1, the formal definition of powertypes in terms of power sets (or sets of subsets) are no longer given. Instead, powertypes are illustrated through various examples.
