= Tom (programming language) =

- Developer: INRIA
- Stable release: 2.10 / 2013-03-21
- Type: program transformation language
- License: GPL, BSD licenses
- Website: tom.loria.fr

Tom is a programming language particularly well-suited for programming various transformations on tree structures and XML-based documents. Tom is a language extension which adds new matching primitives to C and Java as well as support for rewrite rules systems. The rules can be controlled using a strategy language.

Tom is good for:

- programming by pattern matching
- developing compilers and domain-specific languages (DSL)
- transforming XML documents
- implementing rule-based systems
- describing algebraic transformations
