= Model transformation =

A model transformation, in model-driven engineering, is an automated way of modifying and creating platform-specific model from platform-independent ones. An example use of model transformation is ensuring that a family of models is consistent, in a precise sense which the software engineer can define. The aim of using a model transformation is to save effort and reduce errors by automating the building and modification of models where possible.

== Overview ==
Model transformations can be thought of as programs that take models as input. There is a wide variety of kinds of model transformation and uses of them, which differ in their inputs and outputs and also in the way they are expressed.

A model transformation usually specifies which models are acceptable as input, and if appropriate what models it may produce as output, by specifying the metamodel to which a model must conform.

== Classification of model transformations ==
Model transformations and languages for them have been classified in many ways. Some of the more common distinctions drawn are:

=== Number and type of inputs and outputs ===
In principle a model transformation may have many inputs and outputs of various types; the only absolute limitation is that a model transformation will take at least one model as input. However, a model transformation that did not produce any model as output would more commonly be called a model analysis or model query.

=== Endogenous versus exogenous ===
Endogenous transformations are transformations between models expressed in the same language. Exogenous transformations are transformations between models expressed using different languages. For example, in a process conforming to the OMG Model Driven Architecture, a platform-independent model might be transformed into a platform-specific model by an exogenous model transformation.

=== Unidirectional versus bidirectional ===
A unidirectional model transformation has only one mode of execution: that is, it always takes the same type of input and produces the same type of output. Unidirectional model transformations are useful in compilation-like situations, where any output model is read-only. The relevant notion of consistency is then very simple: the input model is consistent with the model that the transformation would produce as output, only.

For a bidirectional model transformation, the same type of model can sometimes be input and other times be output. Bidirectional transformations are necessary in situations where people are working on more than one model and the models must be kept consistent. Then a change to either model might necessitate a change to the other, in order to maintain consistency between the models. Because each model can incorporate information which is not reflected in the other, there may be many models which are consistent with a given model. Important special cases are:

- bijective transformations, in which there is exactly one model which is consistent with any given model; that is, the consistency relation is bijective. A pair of models is consistent if and only if it is related by the consistency bijection. Both models contain the same information, but presented differently.
- view transformations, in which a concrete model determines a single view model, but the same view model might be produced from many different concrete models. The view model is an abstraction of the concrete model. If the view may be updated, a bidirectional transformation is needed. This situation is known in the database field as view-update. Any concrete model is consistent with its view.

It is particularly important that a bidirectional model transformation has appropriate properties to make it behave sensibly: for example, not making changes unnecessarily, or discarding deliberately made changes.

== Languages for model transformations ==
A model transformation may be written in a general purpose programming language, but specialised model transformation languages are also available. Bidirectional transformations, in particular, are best written in a language that ensures the directions are appropriately related. The OMG-standardised model transformation languages are collectively known as QVT.

In some model transformation languages, for example the QVT languages, a model transformation is itself a model, that is, it conforms to a metamodel which is part of the model transformation language's definition. This facilitates the definition of Higher Order Transformations (HOTs), i.e. transformations which have other transformations as input and/or output.

== See also ==
- Model-driven engineering (MDE)
- Model-driven architecture (MDA)
- Domain-specific language (DSL)
- Model transformation language
- Refinement
- Transformation (disambiguation)
- Program transformation
- Data transformation
- Graph transformation
