= Model transformation language =

Specification language

- Paradigm: Model-driven engineering

A model transformation language in systems and software engineering is a language intended specifically for model transformation.

== Overview ==
The notion of model transformation is central to model-driven development. A model transformation, which is essentially a program which operates on models, can be written in a general-purpose programming language, such as Java. However, special-purpose model transformation languages can offer advantages, such as syntax that makes it easy to refer to model elements. For writing bidirectional model transformations, which maintain consistency between two or more models, a specialist bidirectional model transformation language is particularly important, because it can help avoid the duplication that would result from writing each direction of the transformation separately.

Currently, most model transformation languages are being developed in academia. The OMG has standardised a family of model transformation languages called QVT, but the field is still immature.

There are ongoing debates regarding the benefits of specialised model transformation languages, compared to the use of general-purpose programming languages (GPLs) such as Java. While GPLs have advantages in terms of more widely-available practitioner knowledge and tool support, the specialised transformation languages do provide more declarative facilities and more powerful specialised features to support model transformations.

== Available transformation languages ==
- ATL : a transformation language developed by the INRIA
- Beanbag : an operation-based language for establishing consistency over data incrementally
- GReAT : a transformation language available in the GME
- Epsilon family : a model management platform that provides transformation languages for model-to-model, model-to-text, update-in-place, migration and model merging transformations.
- F-Alloy: a DSL reusing part of the Alloy syntax and allowing the concise specification of efficiently computable model transformations.
- Henshin : a model transformation language for EMF, based on graph transformation concepts, providing state space exploration capabilities
- JTL : a bidirectional model transformation language specifically designed to support non-bijective transformations and change propagation
- Kermeta : a general purpose modeling and programming language, also able to perform transformations
- Lx family : a set of low-level transformation languages
- M2M is the Eclipse implementation of the OMG QVT standard
- Mia-TL : a transformation language developed by Mia-Software
- MOF Model to Text Transformation Language: the OMG has defined a standard for expressing M2T transformations
- MOLA : a graphical high-level transformation language built in upon Lx.
- MT : a transformation language developed at King's College, London (UK) (based on Converge PL)
- QVT : the OMG has defined a standard for expressing M2M transformations, called MOF/QVT or in short QVT.
- SiTra : a pragmatic transformation approach based on using a standard programming language, e.g. Java, C#
- Stratego/XT : a transformation language based on rewriting with programmable strategies
- Tefkat : a transformation language and a model transformation engine
- Tom : a language based on rewriting calculus, with pattern-matching and strategies
- UML-RSDS : a model transformation and MDD approach using UML and OCL
- VIATRA : a framework for transformation-based verification and validation environment
- YAMTL: An internal DSL for model transformation within JVM languages (Java, Groovy, Xtend, Kotlin), featuring key characteristics such as runtime performance, reuse of transformation logic, incremental execution, and independence from IDEs.

== See also ==
- Data transformation
- Domain-specific language (DSL)
- Filter (software)
- Model-driven engineering (MDE)
- Model-driven architecture (MDA)
- Template processor
- Transformation language
- Graph Transformation
- Web template
- XSLT - a standard language
