= XML Metadata Interchange =

Standard of Object Management Group

XMI
- Filename extension: .xmi
- Internet media type: application/vnd.xmi+xml
- Type code: TEXT
- Developed by: Object Management Group
- Latest release: 2.5.1; June 2015; 9 years ago
- Type of format: Markup language
- Extended from: XML
- Standard: MOF 2 XMI Mapping
- Open format?: yes
- Website: www.omg.org/spec/XMI

The XML Metadata Interchange (XMI) is an Object Management Group (OMG) standard for exchanging metadata information via Extensible Markup Language (XML).

It can be used for any metadata whose metamodel can be expressed in Meta-Object Facility (MOF), a platform-independent model (PIM).

The most common use of XMI is as an interchange format for UML models, although it can also be used for serialization of models of other languages (metamodels).

== Overview ==
In the OMG vision of modeling, data is split into abstract models and concrete models. The abstract models represent the semantic information, whereas the concrete models represent visual diagrams. Abstract models are instances of arbitrary MOF-based modeling languages such as UML or SysML. For diagrams, the Diagram Interchange (DI, XMI[DI]) standard is used. There are currently several incompatibilities between different modeling tool vendor implementations of XMI, even between interchange of abstract model data. The usage of Diagram Interchange is almost nonexistent. This means exchanging files between UML modeling tools using XMI is rarely possible.

One purpose of XML Metadata Interchange (XMI) is to enable easy interchange of metadata between UML-based modeling tools and MOF-based metadata repositories in distributed heterogeneous environments. XMI is also commonly used as the medium by which models are passed from modeling tools to software generation tools as part of model-driven engineering.

Examples of XMI, and lists of the XML tags that make up XMI-formatted files, are available in the version 2.5.1 specification document.

== Integration of industry standards ==
XMI integrates 4 industry standards:

- XML – Extensible Markup Language, a W3C standard.
- UML – Unified Modeling Language, an OMG modeling standard.
- MOF – Meta Object Facility, an OMG language for specifying metamodels.
- MOF – Mapping to XMI

The integration of these 4 standards into XMI allows tool developers of distributed systems to share object models and other metadata.

Several versions of XMI have been created: 1.0, 1.1, 1.2, 2.0, 2.1, 2.1.1, 2.4, 2.4.1, 2.4.2. and 2 5.1. The 2.x versions are radically different from the 1.x series.

Version	Release date	URL
2.5.1	June 2015	http://www.omg.org/spec/XMI/2.5.1
2.4.2	April 2014	http://www.omg.org/spec/XMI/2.4.2
2.4.1	August 2011	http://www.omg.org/spec/XMI/2.4.1
2.4	March 2011	http://www.omg.org/spec/XMI/2.4
2.1.1	December 2007	http://www.omg.org/spec/XMI/2.1.1
2.1	September 2005	http://www.omg.org/spec/XMI/2.1

The Diagram Definition OMG project is another alternative for metadata interchange, which can also express the layout and graphical representation.

XMI is an international standard:

XMI 2.4.2
ISO/IEC 19509:2014 Information technology — XML Metadata Interchange (XMI)
XMI 2.0
ISO/IEC 19503:2005 Information technology — XML Metadata Interchange (XMI)

== See also ==
- Common Warehouse Metamodel
- Web Ontology Language
- Generic Modeling Environment (GME)
- Eclipse Modeling Framework (EMF)
- Domain Specific Language (DSL)
- Domain-specific modelling (DSM)
- Meta-modeling
- Meta-Object Facility (MOF)
