= Domain-specific modeling =

Software engineering methodology

Domain-specific modeling (DSM) is a software engineering methodology for designing and developing systems, such as computer software. It involves systematic use of a domain-specific modeling language (DSML) to represent the various facets of a system.

Domain-specific modeling languages tend to support higher-level abstractions than general-purpose modeling languages, so they require less effort and fewer low-level details to specify a given system.

== Overview ==
Domain-specific modeling often also includes the idea of code generation: automating the creation of executable source code directly from the domain-specific language models. Being free from the manual creation and maintenance of source code means domain-specific language can significantly improve developer productivity. The reliability of automatic generation compared to manual coding will also reduce the number of defects in the resulting programs thus improving quality.

Domain-specific language differs from earlier code generation attempts in the CASE tools of the 1980s or UML tools of the 1990s. In both of these, the code generators and modeling languages were built by tool vendors. While it is possible for a tool vendor to create a domain-specific language and generators, it is more normal for domain-specific language to occur within one organization. One or a few expert developers creates the modeling language and generators, and the rest of the developers use them.

Having the modeling language and generator built by the organization that will use them allows a tight fit with their exact domain and in response to changes in the domain.

Domain-specific languages can usually cover a range of abstraction levels for a particular domain. For example, a domain-specific modeling language for mobile phones could allow users to specify high-level abstractions for the user interface, as well as lower-level abstractions for storing data such as phone numbers or settings. Likewise, a domain-specific modeling language for financial services could permit users to specify high-level abstractions for clients, as well as lower-level abstractions for implementing stock and bond trading algorithms.

== Topics ==
=== Defining domain-specific languages ===
To define a language, one needs a language to write the definition in. The language of a model is often called a metamodel, hence the language for defining a modeling language is a meta-metamodel. Meta-metamodels can be divided into two groups: those that are derived from or customizations of existing languages, and those that have been developed specifically as meta-metamodels.

Derived meta-metamodels include entity–relationship diagrams, formal languages, extended Backus–Naur form (EBNF), ontology languages, XML schema, and Meta-Object Facility (MOF). The strengths of these languages tend to be in the familiarity and standardization of the original language.

The ethos of domain-specific modeling favors the creation of a new language for a specific task, and so there are unsurprisingly new languages designed as meta-metamodels. The most widely used family of such languages is that of OPRR, GOPRR, and GOPPRR, which focus on supporting things found in modeling languages with the minimum effort.

=== Tool support for domain-specific languages ===
Many General-Purpose Modeling languages already have tool support available in the form of CASE tools. Domain-specific languages tend to have too small a market size to support the construction of a bespoke CASE tool from scratch. Instead, most tool support for domain-specific languages is built based on existing domain-specific language frameworks or through domain-specific language environments.

A domain-specific language environment may be thought of as a metamodeling tool, i.e., a modeling tool used to define a modeling tool or CASE tool. The resulting tool may either work within the domain-specific language environment, or less commonly be produced as a separate stand-alone program. In the more common case, the domain-specific language environment supports an additional layer of abstraction when compared to a traditional CASE tool.

Using a domain-specific language environment can significantly lower the cost of obtaining tool support for a domain-specific language, since a well-designed domain-specific language environment will automate the creation of program parts that are costly to build from scratch, such as domain-specific editors, browsers and components. The domain expert only needs to specify the domain specific constructs and rules, and the domain-specific language environment provides a modeling tool tailored for the target domain.

Most existing domain-specific language takes place with domain-specific language environments, either commercial such as MetaEdit+ or Actifsource, open source such as GEMS, or academic such as GME. The increasing popularity of domain-specific language has led to domain-specific language frameworks being added to existing IDEs, e.g. Eclipse Modeling Project (EMP) with EMF and GMF, or in Microsoft's DSL Tools for Software Factories.

== Domain-specific language and UML ==
The Unified Modeling Language (UML) is a general-purpose modeling language for software-intensive systems that is designed to support mostly object oriented programming. Consequently, in contrast to domain-specific languages, UML is used for a wide variety of purposes across a broad range of domains. The primitives offered by UML are those of object oriented programming, while domain-specific languages offer primitives whose semantics are familiar to all practitioners in that domain. For example, in the domain of automotive engineering, there will be software models to represent the properties of an anti-lock braking system, or a steering wheel, etc.

UML includes a profile mechanism that allows it to be constrained and customized for specific domains and platforms. UML profiles use stereotypes, stereotype attributes (known as tagged values before UML 2.0), and constraints to restrict and extend the scope of UML to a particular domain. Perhaps the best known example of customizing UML for a specific domain is SysML, a domain specific language for systems engineering.

UML is a popular choice for various model-driven development approaches whereby technical artifacts such as source code, documentation, tests, and more are generated algorithmically from a domain model. For instance, application profiles of the legal document standard Alberto Álvarez O. can be developed by representing legal concepts and ontologies in UML class objects.

== See also ==
- Computer-aided software engineering
- Domain-driven design
- Domain-specific language
- Framework-specific modeling language
- General-purpose modeling
- Domain-specific multimodeling
- Model-driven engineering
- Model-driven architecture
- Software factories
- Discipline-Specific Modeling
