= Model-driven engineering =

Software development methodology

Model-driven engineering (MDE) is a software development methodology that focuses on creating and exploiting domain models, which are conceptual models of all the topics related to a specific problem. Hence, it highlights and aims at abstract representations of the knowledge and activities that govern a particular application domain, rather than the computing (i.e., algorithmic) concepts.

MDE is a subfield of a software design approach referred as round-trip engineering. The scope of the MDE is much wider than that of the model-driven architecture.

== Overview ==
The MDE approach is meant to increase productivity by maximizing compatibility between systems (via reuse of standardized models), simplifying the process of design (via models of recurring design patterns in the application domain), and promoting communication between individuals and teams working on the system (via a standardization of the terminology and the best practices used in the application domain). For instance, in model-driven development, technical artifacts such as source code, documentation, tests, and more are generated algorithmically from a domain model.

A modeling paradigm for MDE is considered effective if its models make sense from the point of view of a user that is familiar with the domain, and if they can serve as a basis for implementing systems. The models are developed through extensive communication among product managers, designers, developers and users of the application domain. As the models approach completion, they enable the development of software and systems.

Some of the better known MDE initiatives are:

- The Object Management Group (OMG) initiative Model-Driven Architecture (MDA) which is leveraged by several of their standards such as Meta-Object Facility, XMI, CWM, CORBA, Unified Modeling Language (to be more precise, the OMG currently promotes the use of a subset of UML called fUML together with its action language, ALF, for model-driven architecture; a former approach relied on Executable UML and OCL, instead), and QVT.
- The Eclipse "eco-system" of programming and modelling tools represented in general terms by the (Eclipse Modeling Framework). This framework allows the creation of tools implementing the MDA standards of the OMG; but, it is also possible to use it to implement other modeling-related tools.

== History ==
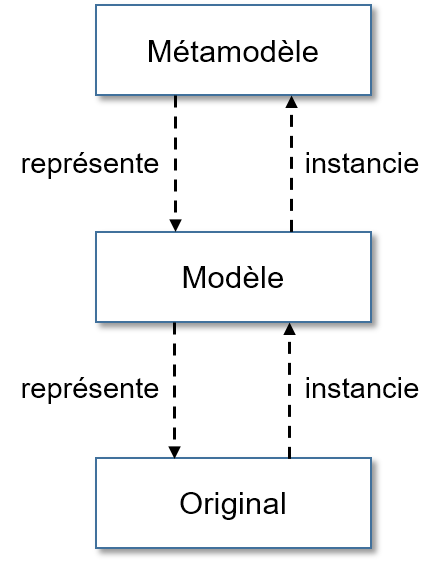
A chart showing the instantiations and representation links between a metamodel, a model and an original (in French).

The first tools to support MDE were the Computer-Aided Software Engineering (CASE) tools developed in the 1980s. Companies like Integrated Development Environments (IDE – StP), Higher Order Software (now Hamilton Technologies, Inc., HTI), Cadre Technologies, Bachman Information Systems, and Logic Works (BP-Win and ER-Win) were pioneers in the field.

The US government got involved in the modeling definitions creating the IDEF specifications. With several variations of the modeling definitions (see Booch, Rumbaugh, Jacobson, Gane and Sarson, Harel, Shlaer and Mellor, and others) they were eventually joined creating the Unified Modeling Language (UML). Rational Rose, a product for UML implementation, was done by Rational Corporation (Booch) responding automation yield higher levels of abstraction in software development. This abstraction promotes simpler models with a greater focus on problem space. Combined with executable semantics this elevates the total level of automation possible. The Object Management Group (OMG) has developed a set of standards called Model-Driven Architecture (MDA), building a foundation for this advanced architecture-focused approach.

The first research paper to explicitly refer to MDE appears to be. These ideas originated from the work of the "Precise UML" group (pUML) of researchers including Robert France, Bernhard Rumpe, Kevin Lano and others.

== Advantages ==
According to Douglas C. Schmidt, model-driven engineering technologies offer a promising approach to address the inability of third-generation languages to alleviate the complexity of platforms and express domain concepts effectively.

== Tools ==
Notable software tools for model-driven engineering include:

- AADL from Carnegie-Mellon Software Engineering Institute
- Acceleo an open source code generator from Obeo
- Actifsource
- AgileUML an open source MDE toolset from AgileMDE Ltd
- Ash Framework an open source Elixir-based declarative application framework
- ATLAS Transformation Language or ATL, a model transformation language from Obeo
- DUALLy, an MDE framework to create interoperability
- Eclipse Modeling Framework (EMF)
- Enterprise Architect from Sparx Systems
- eTrice an open source implementation of the Real-Time Object-Oriented Modeling standard
- Generic Eclipse Modeling System (GEMS)
- GeneXus a knowledge-based, declarative, multi-platform, multi-language development solution
- Graphical Modeling Framework (GMF)
- JetBrains MPS, a metaprogramming system from JetBrains
- MagicDraw from No Magic Inc
- MDriven – a UML-based, model-driven development platform that generates .NET and web applications from executable models.
- MERODE JMermaid from KU Leuven (educational)
- MetaEdit+ from MetaCase
- ModelCenter from Phoenix Integration
- Open ModelSphere
- OptimalJ from Compuware
- PREEvision from Vector Informatik
- Rhapsody from IBM
- PowerDesigner from SAP
- Simulink from MathWorks
- Software Ideas Modeler from Dusan Rodina
- Sirius an Eclipse open source project to create custom graphical modeling workbenches
- Together Architect from Borland
- Umbrello by KDE
- Umple from the University of Ottawa
- Uniface from Compuware
- YAKINDU Statechart Tools open source tool build on top of Eclipse

== See also ==
- Application lifecycle management (ALM)
- Business Process Model and Notation (BPMN)
- Business-driven development (BDD)
- Domain-driven design (DDD)
- Domain-specific language (DSL)
- Domain-specific modeling (DSM)
- Domain-specific multimodeling
- Language-oriented programming (LOP)
- List of Unified Modeling Language tools
- Model transformation (e.g. using QVT)
- Model-based testing (MBT)
- Modeling Maturity Level (MML)
- Model-based systems engineering (MBSE)
- Service-oriented modeling Framework (SOMF)
- Software factory (SF)
- Story-driven modeling (SDM)
- Open API, open source specification for description of models and operations for HTTP interoperation and REST APIc
