= Object Management Group =

Computer industry standards consortium

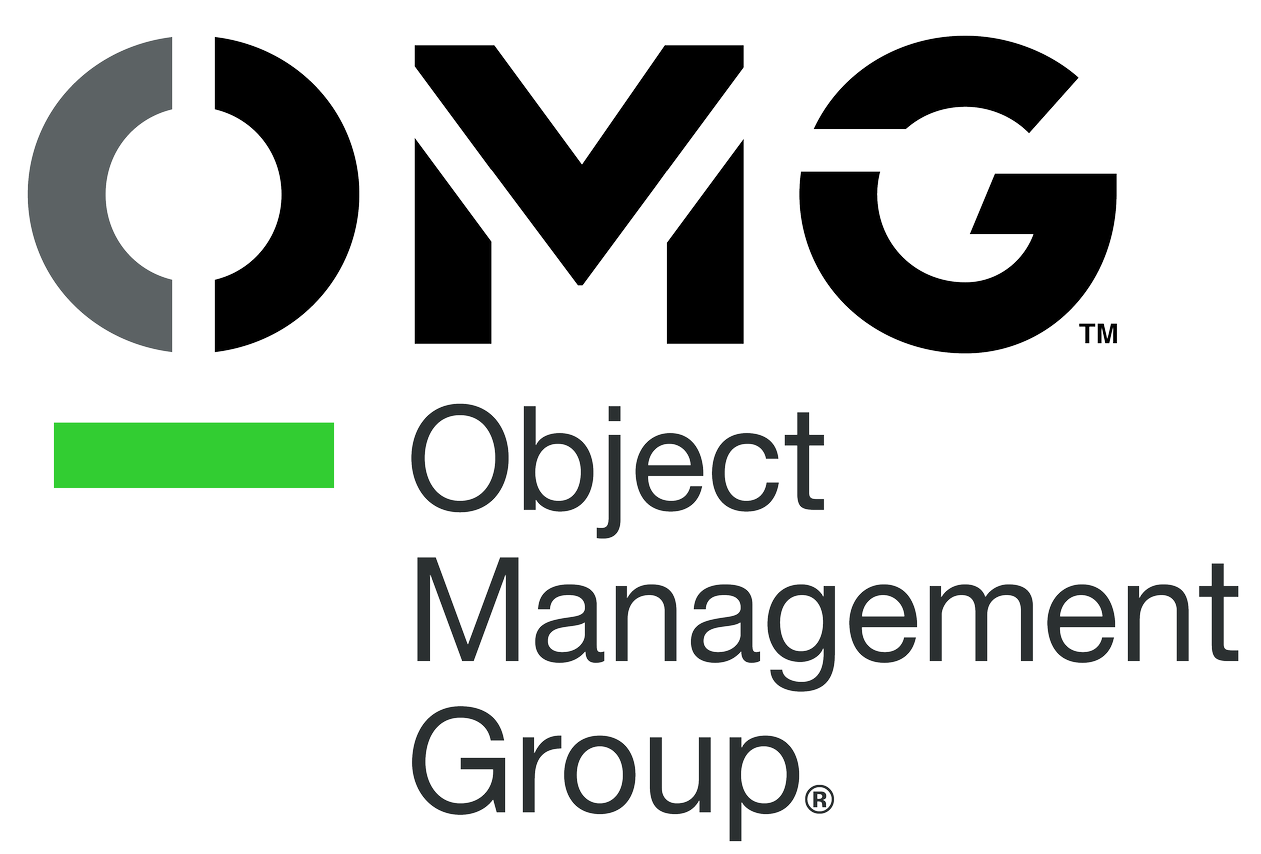
- Abbreviation: OMG
- Formation: 1989; 37 years ago
- Type: Nonprofit
- Legal status: Consortium
- Purpose: Standards development
- Headquarters: 9C Medway Road, PMB 274; Milford, Massachusetts
- Official language: English
- Website: www.omg.org

The Object Management Group (OMG) is a computer industry standards development organization (SDO), or voluntary consensus standards body (VCSB). OMG develops enterprise integration and modeling standards for a range of technologies.

== Business activities ==
The goal of the OMG was a common portable and interoperable object model with methods and data that work using all types of development environments on all types of platforms.

The group provides only specifications, not implementations. But before a specification can be accepted as a standard by the group, the members of the submitter team must guarantee that they will bring a conforming product to market within a year. This is an attempt to prevent unimplemented (and unimplementable) technical standards. Other private companies or open source groups are encouraged to produce conforming products and OMG is attempting to develop mechanisms to enforce true interoperability.

OMG hosts four technical meetings per year for its members and interested nonmembers, to discuss, develop and adopt standards for software interoperability.

== History ==
Founded in 1989 by eleven companies (including Hewlett-Packard, IBM, Sun Microsystems, Apple Computer, American Airlines, iGrafx, and Data General), OMG's initial focus was to create a heterogeneous distributed object standard. The founding executive team included Christopher Stone and John Slitz. Current leadership includes chairman and CEO Bill Hoffman and Technical Director Mike Bennett. Dr. Richard Soley, who led OMG from its creation onwards and was its Chairman and President, died in 2023.

Since 2000, the group's international headquarters has been located in Boston, Massachusetts; however, OMG's corporate office is now virtual.

OMG is a standards development organization which technical work is accomplished by Task Forces, Special Interest Groups, and an Architecture Board (Structure and Governance).

Over OMG's history, its members have defined more than 200 standard specifications. A few of the most widely known OMG standards are mentioned below.

- The earliest one, adopted in 1991, was the Common Object Request Broker Architecture (CORBA).
- In 1997, the Unified Modeling Language (UML) was added to the list of OMG adopted technologies. UML is a standardized general-purpose modeling language in the field of object-oriented software engineering.
- In June 2005, the Business Process Management Initiative (BPMI.org) and OMG announced the merger of their respective Business Process Management (BPM) activities to form the Business Modeling and Integration Domain Task Force (BMI DTF).
- In 2006 the Business Process Model and Notation (BPMN) was adopted as a standard by OMG. In 2007 the Business Motivation Model (BMM) was adopted as a standard by the OMG. The BMM is a metamodel that provides a vocabulary for corporate governance and strategic planning and is particularly relevant to businesses undertaking governance, regulatory compliance, business transformation and strategic planning activities.
- In 2009 OMG, together with the Software Engineering Institute at Carnegie Mellon launched the Consortium of IT Software Quality (CISQ).
- In April 2011 OMG formed the Cloud Standards Customer Council. Founding sponsors included CA, IBM, Kaavo, Rackspace and Software AG. The CSCC was an end user advocacy group dedicated to accelerating cloud's successful adoption, and drilling down into the standards, security and interoperability issues surrounding the transition to the cloud. In July 2018, the CSCC was reformed as the OMG Cloud Working Group.
- In September 2011, the OMG Board of Directors voted to adopt the Vector Signal and Image Processing Library (VSIPL) specification. Work for adopting the specification was led by Mentor Graphics' Embedded Software Division, RunTime Computing Solutions, The Mitre Corporation, and the High Performance Embedded Computing Software Initiative (HPEC-SI). VSIPL is an application programming interface (API). VSIPL and VSIPL++ contain functions used for common signal processing kernel and other computations. These functions include basic arithmetic, trigonometric, transcendental, signal processing, linear algebra, and image processing. The VSIPL family of libraries has been implemented by multiple vendors for a range of processor architectures, including x86, PowerPC, Cell, and Nvidia graphics processing units (GPUs). VSIPL and VSIPL++ are designed to maintain portability as cross-platform software across a range of processor architectures, and VSIPL++ is designed from the start to include support for parallel computing.
- In Late 2012, the group's Board of Directors adopted the Automated Function Point (AFP) specification. The push for adoption was led by the Consortium for IT Software Quality (CISQ). AFP provides a standard for automating the popular function point measure according to the counting guidelines of the International Function Point User Group (IFPUG).
- On March 27, 2014, OMG announced it would be managing the newly formed Industrial Internet Consortium (IIC).
- In December 2019, OMG formed an Artificial Intelligence Platform Task Force.
- In 2020, OMG formed the Digital Twin Consortium (DTC), and in January 2024 the IIC was merged into the DTC.
- The Augmented Reality for Enterprise Alliance (AREA), founded in 2014, also became a managed program of OMG in October 2021.

== Ratified ISO standards ==
Of the many standards maintained by the OMG, 13 have been ratified as International Organization for Standardization (ISO) standards. These standards are:

- Business Process Model and Notation (BPMN)
- Business Process Maturity Model (BPMM)
- Common Object Request Broker Architecture (CORBA)
- Meta Object Facility (MOF)
- Knowledge Discovery Metamodel (KDM)
- Automated Function Points (AFP)
- Object Constraint Language (OCL)
- Systems Modeling Language (SysML)
- Unified Modeling Language (UML)
- Unified Profile for DoDAF/MODAF (UPDM)
- XML Metadata Interchange (XMI)

Historically, there were packages org.omg.* in Java and its standard library named the Java Class Library. These have since been deprecated in Java 9 and removed in Java 11.

== See also ==
- DIIOP
- Requirements Interchange Format (ReqIF)
