= List of Eclipse projects =

The following is a list of notable Eclipse projects.

Although some of the listed projects play a vital role for the Eclipse IDE the Eclipse project ecosystem covers a significantly larger scope than the Eclipse IDE.

== Official projects ==
These projects are maintained by the Eclipse community and hosted by the Eclipse Foundation.

=== Top-level sub-projects ===
- Eclipse Platform is the core framework that all other Eclipse projects are built on.
- Java development tools (JDT) provides support for core Java SE. This includes a standalone fast incremental compiler.
- Plug-in Development Environment (PDE) provides tools to create, develop, test, debug, build and deploy Eclipse plug-ins, fragments, features, update sites and RCP products.
- Orion, CHE, Dirigible and Theia are browser-based IDEs and open tool integration platform which is entirely focused on developing for the web, in the web. Tools are written in JavaScript and run in the browser.
- Oniro is an Open Source software platform, having an operating system, standard APIs and basic applications.

=== Tools ===
The following sub-projects are located under the Tools sub-project:

- Buckminster adds support for Component Assemblies.
- C/C++ Development Tools (CDT) adds support for C/C++ syntax highlighting, code formatting, debugger integration and project structures. Unlike the JDT project, the CDT project does not add a compiler and relies on an external tool chain.
- Graphical Editing Framework (GEF) allows developers to build standalone graphical tools. Example use include circuit diagram design tools, activity diagram editors and WYSIWYG document editors.
- PHP Development Tools (PDT)
- Parallel Tools Platform (PTP) adds support for parallel and high-performance computing development, analysis, run/monitoring, debugging, and performance analysis.
- WindowBuilder is a bi-directional Java GUI designer.

Projects requiring an older version of the Eclipse platform:

- AspectJ Development Tools (AJDT) adds support for the AspectJ Java extensions. AJDT require Eclipse 3.4 (Ganymede).

=== Modeling ===
The following sub-projects are located under the Modeling sub-project:

- Eclipse Modeling Framework (EMF), a modeling framework and code generation facility for building tools and other applications based on a structured data model, from a model specification described in XMI.
- Graphical Modeling Framework (GMF) is a generative component and runtime infrastructure for developing graphical editors based on EMF and GEF.
- Acceleo, an Open Source code generator that uses EMF based models to generate any textual language (Java, PHP, Python, etc.).
- Sirius, an Open Source project to create custom graphical modeling workbenches by leveraging the Eclipse Modeling technologies, including EMF and GMF.
- eTrice, an implementation of the Real-Time Object-Oriented Modeling language ROOM for event driven real-time software systems.
- Vorto, standardization of information models which are an abstraction of a physical, real-world device.
- Eclipse Papyrus Papyrus is an industrial-grade open source Model-Based Engineering tool. Papyrus has notably been used successfully in industrial projects and is the base platform for several industrial modeling tools.

=== Technology ===
The following sub-projects are located under the Technology sub-project:

- Eclipse Scout is a framework for implementing multitier business applications based on the Eclipse platform.
- Eclipse SUMO is a free and open traffic simulation toolsuite.
- g-Eclipse provides a middleware independent framework and exemplary implementations for users, developers, and administrators accessing Computing Grids.
- Subversive — SVN Team Provider is aimed at providing Subversion support similar to that previously provided for CVS.

=== Other ===
- Application Lifecycle Framework, a closed project
- Business Intelligence and Reporting Tools Project (BIRT), an Eclipse-based open source reporting system for web applications, especially those based on Java EE.
- Data Tools Platform Project (DTP) provides relational database connectivity and SQL design tools.
- Mylyn is a task-focused interface for Eclipse combining a task manager that integrates with bug trackers (such as Bugzilla, Trac and JIRA) and version control software with dynamic code filtering.
- Test and Performance Tools Platform (TPTP) which provides a platform that allows software developers to build test and performance tools, such as debuggers, profilers and benchmarking applications.
- Web Standard Tools (WST) adds standards compliant web development tools. These tools include editors for XML, HTML and CSS.
- Mihini, an embedded runtime running on top of Linux, that exposes high-level Lua API for building M2M applications. Mihini aims at enabling easy and portable development, by facilitating access to the I/Os of an M2M system, providing a communication layer, etc.

== Third-party projects ==
- Android Development Tools Plugin for Eclipse is an Android Development Toolkit plugin for Eclipse.
- CFEclipse is an open source ColdFusion IDE based on the Eclipse platform.
- EPIC is an open source Perl IDE based on the Eclipse platform.
- Adobe Flash Builder is an Eclipse-based IDE for developing rich Internet applications (RIAs) with the Adobe Flash/Flex framework.
- Google Plugin for Eclipse is a Google App Engine and Google Web Toolkit plugin.
- Groovy & Grails Tool Suite (GGTS) is an open source Eclipse based IDE tailored to developing Groovy programs and Grails web applications. Like Spring Tool Suite, GGTS includes the developer edition of VMware vFabric tc Server.
- JBoss Developer Studio (JBDS) is a development environment combining tooling and components of Eclipse, the Eclipse Web Tools Project, and the JBoss Enterprise Application Platform.
- The JMLSpecs Project adds support for the JML specification language to the Java features provided by the JDT. The project currently provides automatic JML compilation, the standard JML toolset, and Eclipse UI features such as syntax highlighting and content assistance.
- Nodeclipse is Eclipse-based IDE for Node.js development.
- PyDev is a fully functional Python Integrated Development Environment (IDE) with refactoring support, and graphical debugging.
- RadRails is an IDE for Ruby on Rails.
- Ruby Development Tools (RDT) is an open source Ruby IDE for the Eclipse platform.
- ScalaIDE plugin allows Eclipse users to design, debug and build programs in Scala. The ScalaIDE supports mixed Scala/Java Projects, code completion, and an integrated debugger.
- Spring Tool Suite (STS) is an open source IDE (also available as an Eclipse plugin) for building applications utilizing the Spring Framework. STS includes the developer edition of vFabric tc Server, advanced code completion and refactoring, a graphical Spring configuration editor, and tools for Spring Web Flow, Spring Batch, Spring Roo, and Spring Integration.
- Wolfram Workbench is an IDE based on Eclipse (also available as an Eclipse plugin) for the Mathematica language.
- WOLips is an IDE for WebObjects.

== See also ==
- Adoptium
- List of Eclipse-based software
