= Itemis =

Coordinates: 51.60485°N 7.45350°E

itemis AG
- Type: Limited company (Aktiengesellschaft (AG))
- Industry: Software
- Founded: 2003
- Headquarters: Dortmund, Germany, DE
- Number of locations: 6
- Key people: Supervisory board: Michael Neuhaus (Chairman); Harald Goertz; Eric Swehla; Board: Jens Wagener
- Revenue: No information
- Number of employees: 220 (220)
- Website: www.itemis.com

itemis AG, headquartered in Dortmund (North Rhine-Westphalia), is a German IT consulting and software development company, active among other things in the field of model-driven software development (MDSD). With the YAKINDU product family, itemis sells a number of self-developed software products.

== History ==
itemis AG was founded in 2003 as a GmbH & Co. KG by Wolfgang Neuhaus and Jens Wagener. In September 2007, the change of the legal form took place. Until its move to Dortmund, itemis AG was one of the largest IT companies in the Lünen region, where the company's headquarter was located on the premises of the LÜNTEC Technology Center in the Brambauer part of town. In 2025, itemis AG relocated its headquarter to Lensing Media Port in Dortmund's city harbor.

Other German locations are in Frankfurt am Main, Hamburg, Heide, Leipzig, and Stuttgart.

From 2009 to 2020, itemis was also represented in Windisch in the Swiss canton of Aargau. On December 11, 2020, itemis Schweiz GmbH was renamed Arcware GmbH; itemis AG withdrew as a shareholder.

From 2009 to 2020, itemis was also represented in Windisch in the Swiss canton of Aargau. On 2020-12-11, itemis Schweiz GmbH was renamed Arcware GmbH; itemis AG ceased to be a company partner.

=== Insolvency proceedings (2024–2025) ===
On 29 July 2024, itemis AG filed for insolvency under self-administration with the Dortmund Local Court (Amtsgericht Dortmund). The court opened regular insolvency proceedings on 31 October 2024 under case number 252 IN 1026/24. Attorney Dr. David Bunzel from the law firm Husemann & Partner was appointed as chief representative (Generalbevollmächtigter), and attorney Marvin Bauernfeind from BBL Brockdorff acted as custodian (Sachwalter).

The company's financial difficulties were related to the tense situation of the German economy and the automotive industry. During the proceedings, business operations continued without interruption; salaries were covered by the statutory insolvency payment scheme (Insolvenzgeld).

On 23 April 2025, the insolvency plan for the restructuring of itemis AG was unanimously approved by the creditors and confirmed by the Dortmund Local Court on 28 April 2025.

=== Relocation to Dortmund ===
As part of the company's realignment following the conclusion of the insolvency proceedings, itemis AG relocated its headquarters from Lünen to Dortmund and expanded its business activities, including entry into the defense industry.

== Business ==
=== Thematic fields ===
Itemis AG offers consulting services and software development in various areas of modern IT, including data science (artificial intelligence, machine learning), smart technologies (smart home, IoT, industry 4.0), web development, IT modernization, software & systems engineering, usability engineering, and agile software development.

=== Software development ===
To implement software development projects, itemis AG frequently uses its expertise in building domain-specific languages and in model-driven software development (see below).

The company is frequently represented with presentations or as an exhibitor at IT events and other business events in various industries. It also offers its own events on the subject of software development.

=== Products ===
In addition to customized individual solutions, itemis AG also offers its own software products:

- itemis ANALYZE (formerly YAKINDU Traceability): Traceability management in the development process
- itemis CREATE (formerly YAKINDU Statechart Tools): State machine development
- itemis SECURE (formerly YAKINDU Security Analyst): Cybersecurity risk analysis of technical systems

== Model-driven software development ==
itemis AG was initially active in the field of model-driven software development (MDSD). After MDSD was first introduced primarily in the development of enterprise applications, itemis AG also transferred these approaches to the development of embedded systems, which are used, for example, in aircraft, cars or production facilities.

=== Development tools ===
Tools (editors, generators, validators) are required to support model-driven development processes. itemis AG initially developed such tools under an open-source license and made them available under the umbrella of the Eclipse project.

=== Research projects ===
Since 2005, itemis AG has participated in 22 research projects, according to their own statements, and has also held the project management for some of them. This also included the management of research projects for the practical transfer and further development of research results within the context of model-driven development techniques. Within the scope of the MDA4E research project, model-driven development methods for the development of embedded systems based on the Eclipse project were developed. Further research projects dealt with the model-driven development of product management systems, the integrated specification of mechatronic products and production systems, the reuse of simulation models and the construction of model repositories. Research partners were Dortmund University of Applied Sciences and Arts (Fachhochschule Dortmund), Westfälische Wilhelms-Universität Münster, Paderborn University, Karlsruhe Institute of Technology in Karlsruhe, German Aerospace Center (Deutsches Zentrum für Luft- und Raumfahrt) headquartered in Cologne, and Leipzig University.

=== Publications and lectures ===
Research results and practical experience are publicly discussed and published through events of the Special Interest Group Model Driven Software Engineering. Furthermore, itemis AG is represented in the Gesellschaft für Informatik's working group for model-driven software architecture and in the BITKOM industry association's strategy circle for software-intensive, embedded systems. Employees of itemis AG have written technical books on model-driven software development. Itemis AG employees have also repeatedly published articles in journals, e.g. in Javaspektrum, in Javamagazin, in OBJEKTspektrum, in Computerwoche, in Elektronikpraxis, and in Eclipse Magazin.

itemis employees held talks at technical conferences such as OOP and Embedded World.

== Scrum ==
itemis AG has been licensed by the Scrum.org organization to carry out certification classes for the agile project management method Scrum. Furthermore, itemis AG employees wrote a book on agile project management with Scrum. Today, itemis AG offers preparatory courses for Scrum certifications, which are approved by TÜV Süd.

== Eclipse ==
Itemis AG was at times one of twelve strategic members of Eclipse Foundation, the umbrella organization of the Eclipse project, and was represented on the board of directors. Today, the company is a solution member of the Eclipse Foundation.

Itemis AG founded the Xtext and Xtend projects and managed the Eclipse Modeling Framework project in collaboration with Ed Merks.

Itemis AG is one of the founding members of the OpenADx working group within the Eclipse Foundation. OEMs from the automotive industry, tool manufacturers, and developers are working together here to create better compatibility, common interfaces and broader interoperability of software for autonomous driving. This is how OpenADx aims to accelerate innovation and productivity. Other founding members are AVL, Bosch, Eteration, IBM, JC Information Management, Red Hat and Siemens.

== Awards ==
- Innovator of the year 2019: First place in the TOP 100 innovation competition in size class B (up to 200 employees)
- Crefozert (2010 – 2018): Creditreform Dortmund's annually awarded rating seal
- Innovative through research (2018/2019): Award by the Donors' Association for the Promotion of Sciences and Humanities in Germany (ITE4842LUE)
- Innovative through research (2016/2017): Award by the Donors' Association for the Promotion of Sciences and Humanities in Germany (ITE1399LUE)
- Deloitte Technology Fast 50 (2011): Awarded as being one of the fifty fastest-growing technology companies
- Deutscher Personalwirtschaftspreis 2010: First place at the “Human Resources Competition” (Deutscher Personalwirtschaftspreis) for the working time model “4+1”
- Agile Leadership Award 2010: First place for competence in agile project management
- Deloitte Technology Fast 50 (2009): Honored as one of the ten fastest growing technology companies.
- Land der Ideen 2008: Included as a "select place" in the Federal Initiative "Germany – Land of Ideas" (Bundesinitiative "Deutschland – Land der Ideen")
- Jax Innovation Award 2007: Third place for openArchitectureWare
- Award winner at the "Ruhr Area Competition for the Future" (Zukunftswettbewerb Ruhrgebiet) in the years 2005 and 2006, under the "Objective 2" (Ziel 2) program of the State of North Rhine-Westphalia with Research Center Jülich (Forschungszentrum Jülich) being the research management organization. The funds were awarded by the Center for Innovation and Technology (Zentrum für Innovation und Technik, ZENIT).
- Start2Grow 2004 founding competition by the municipality of Dortmund
