= List of Eclipse Modeling Framework based software =

This is a list about tools using the Eclipse Modeling Framework.

== List of tools internally available from the Eclipse platform ==
- Connected Data Objects (CDO): A free implementation of a Distributed Shared Model on top of EMF
- ATL: A QVT-like language functioning with Eclipse/EMF, together with a library of model transformations. ATL is the current Eclipse M2M solution.
- Borland Together: A Java and UML modeling IDE with QVT integration.
- KM3: A metamodeling language; Metamodels written in KM3 may be automatically converted in a number of other metameta models.
- Acceleo: A code generator implementing the OMG MOFM2T specification.
- VIATRA2: A graph-based transformation language.
- GEMS: A bridge between Generic Modeling Environment (GME) and the Eclipse Modeling Project (EMP).
- Xtext: A framework for the development of domain-specific languages and other textual programming languages.
- Sirius: Technology for creating custom graphical modeling workbenches by leveraging the Eclipse Modeling technologies, including EMF and GMF.

== List of tools that may use Eclipse EMF but are available on private source-forges or others development repositories ==
- SmartQVT: An open source implementation of the QVT-Operational language. This tool compiles QVT transformations into EMF-based Java programs.
- Kermeta: A multi-purpose tool made by IRISA and based on EMF for model development, model constraint checking, model exploration, model transformation and much more.
- Papyrus: A MDE UML modeler based on EMF.
- Rational Software Modeler: A UML modeler that uses the EMF-based UML2 model.
