= RascalMPL =

Rascal is a domain-specific language for metaprogramming and language oriented programming, such as static code analysis, program transformation, program generation and implementation of domain-specific languages. It is a general meta language in the sense that it does not have a bias for any particular software language. It includes primitives from relational calculus and term rewriting. Its syntax and semantics are based on procedural (imperative) and functional programming.

== Generating Integrated development environments ==
- Rascal derives Eclipse plugins for any Rascal-implemented software language
- Rascal derives VScode extensions based on the Language Server Protocol for any Rascal-implemented software language

Rascal
- Developer: SWAT group at the CWI
- Stable release: 0.30.1 / 5 July 2023
- Operating system: Linux, Unix, Windows, Mac OS X
- Type: program transformation system, program analysis system, language-oriented programming
- License: BSD, EPL
- Website: https://www.rascal-mpl.org

== See also ==
- ASF+SDF
- Stratego/XT
- DMS Software Reengineering Toolkit
- ANTLR
- Source-to-source compiler
- Racket programming language
