= List of program transformation systems =

This article lists notable program transformation systems by alphabetical order:

- ATC
- CIL (for C)
- Coccinelle (for C)
- DMS
- JetBrains MPS
- Nemerle
- Rascal Metaprogramming Language
- Spoon (for Java)
- TXL
- The FermaT Program Transformation System
