= SDF2 =

SDF2 or variants may refer to:

- Syntax Definition Formalism 2, in computer science
- SDF-2 Megaroad-01, a fictional spaceship from the Japanese series Macross
- Screen Definition Facility II (SDF II), a software tool from IBM
- SDF2, an Amazon locations
