= Sub-language =

Sub-language may refer to:

- Domain-specific language (DSL), and in particular embedded DSLs, which are hosted within a parent programming language
- Variety (linguistics) – Specific form of a language or language cluster
  - Dialect – Variant of a language
