= SCT =

SCT, a three-letter acronym, may refer to:

== Businesses and organizations ==
- Scientific Cutting Tools, a U.S. manufacturer of carbide cutting tools
- Save China's Tigers, an international organisation that aims to save South China tigers
- SCT Logistics, a transport company in Australia
- Secretariat of Communications and Transportation (Mexico), Mexico's federal ministry of transportation and communications
- Slovenija ceste Tehnika, formerly the biggest Slovenian construction company
- Southampton Container Terminals, a port operator in Southampton, England
- Sree Chitra Thirunal College of Engineering, Kerala, India
- Suffolk County Transit, a bus system that serves Suffolk County, New York
- Systems & Computer Technology Corp., which was acquired by SunGard

== Science ==
- Sacrococcygeal teratoma, a kind of tumor
- SCT (gene), gene for a human hormone secretin
- Scutum, a constellation
- Semi-Conductor Tracker, part of the Inner Detector in the ATLAS experiment
- Signed Certificate Timestamps, a part of Certificate Transparency
- Systems-centered therapy, a type of psychotherapy also frequently utilized in organizational development
- Social cognitive theory, a psychological theory about learning through observation
- Social choice theory, a branch of economics about collective decision-making
- Schmidt–Cassegrain telescope

== Medicine ==
- Sluggish cognitive tempo, a potentially new attention disorder, see Cognitive disengagement syndrome
- SNOMED-CT, a systematic clinical terminology
- Stem cell transplantation, see Hematopoietic stem cell transplantation

== Other uses ==
- Scotland, per BS 6879 standard
- Sentence completion tests
- SEPA Credit Transfer, a standardised pan-European payment instrument used across the Single Euro Payments Area or SEPA
- Seychelles Time, a time zone used in the Seychelles
- Signed certificate timestamp, a timestamp returned by the certificate transparency log when a valid digital certificate is submitted
- Socotra Airport, on a Yemeni island of Socotra in the Indian Ocean
- Survival craft transceiver, a type of handheld radiotelephone used for maritime on-scene rescue communication
- YAKINDU Statechart Tools, software for the specification and development of reactive, event-driven systems

== See also ==
- S. Ct.
