= ETrice =

eTrice
- Original author: Thomas Schütz
- Developer: Henrik Rentz-Reichert
- Release: December 9, 2011
- Stable release: 5.10.0 / October 5, 2026; 20 days ago
- Operating system: Cross-platform
- Type: Computer-aided software engineering
- License: Eclipse Public License
- Website: eclipse.org/etrice/

eTrice is a CASE-Tool for the development of real-time software. It is an official Eclipse project.

The software architecture tooling eTrice is implementing the domain specific language Real-Time Object-Oriented Modeling ROOM. It provides code generators for C, C++ and Java. Each release is accompanied with tutorials and a training is provided.

Since ObjecTime Developer went out of support, eTrice is the only remaining implementation of ROOM.

== Literature ==
- Bran Selic, Garth Gullekson, Paul T. Ward: Real-Time Object-Oriented Modeling. John Wiley & Sons Inc, New York 1994, ISBN 978-0-471-59917-3
- New Edition: Bran Selic, Garth Gullekson, Paul T. Ward: Real-Time Object-Oriented Modeling. MBSE4U, Hamburg 2023, ISBN 978-3911081016
