= Graphical Modeling Framework =

- Developer(s): Eclipse Foundation
- Stable release: 1.12.1 / June 19, 2019; 5 years ago
- Written in: Java
- Operating system: Cross-platform
- Platform: Java platform
- License: Eclipse Public License
- Website: www.eclipse.org/modeling/gmp/

The Graphical Modeling Framework (GMF) is a framework within the Eclipse platform. It provides a generative component and runtime infrastructure for developing graphical editors based on the Eclipse Modeling Framework (EMF) and Graphical Editing Framework (GEF). The project aims to provide these components, in addition to exemplary tools for select domain models which illustrate its capabilities.

GMF was first released as part of the Eclipse 3.2 Callisto release in June 2006.

== See also ==
- Connected Data Objects (CDO), a free implementation of a Distributed Shared Model on top of EMF
- Model-driven architecture
- Generic Eclipse Modeling System (GEMS)
- Eclipse Modeling Framework (EMF)
- List of EMF based software
- ATL (A Model Transformation Language)
- Service-Oriented Modeling Framework (SOMF)
