= Software language =

Artificial language for software development

A software language is an artificial language used in the development of software systems. The term is more general than programming language and also includes modelling languages, query languages, transformation languages, software interfaces, database schemata, domain-specific languages, markup languages, etc.
