= Source code in database =

Source code in database (SCID) is a technique of code manipulation where the code is parsed and stored in a database. This allows many productivity-enhancing shortcuts which were otherwise not possible.

A drawback of SCID systems is that code with syntax errors or other code that cannot be parsed, cannot be imported into a SCID system directly. One workaround for this is to comment out code that doesn't parse correctly.

Visual programming tools may store programs as databases, since specialized structure editors are required to edit visual code.

== Examples ==
IBM VisualAge Java is an example of an integrated development environment implementing SCID features. A more recent example of Source Code in Database is CodeOntology, an open source tool and RDF database of Java source code that supports advanced SPARQL queries, such as Select recursive methods or Select methods that compute the cube root of a double.

Some other examples or discussions of SCID include:

1. http://www.c2.com/cgi/wiki?SourceCodeInDatabase
2. http://mindprod.com/project/scid.html
3. http://martinfowler.com/bliki/ProjectionalEditing.html

Also, Eric & Mike Hewitt from PrecisionSoftware were working on a SCID in C# in 2014.

== See also ==
- Homoiconicity
