= RadRails =

Aptana RadRails
- Developer(s): Aptana
- Stable release: 3.2.2
- Operating system: Cross-platform
- Type: Integrated development environment
- License: GNU General Public License v3 or Aptana Public License
- Website: www.aptana.com/products/radrails.html

RadRails was a Rapid Application Development IDE for the Ruby on Rails framework. The goal of RadRails was to provide Ruby on Rails developers with everything they needed to develop, manage, test and deploy their applications. Features included source control, code assist, refactoring, debugging, WEBrick servers, generator wizards, syntax highlighting, data tools, and much more.

The RadRails IDE was built on the Eclipse RCP, and included the RDT and Subclipse plug-in. The RadRails tools were also available as Eclipse plug-ins.

At EclipseCon 2006 RadRails won the Community Award for Best Open-Source Eclipse-based tool.

RadRails was later integrated into the larger Aptana Studio product and discontinued as a standalone project.

== History ==
RadRails was started by Kyle Shank, Marc Baumbach, and Matt Kent in September 2005. During that time, the three developers worked as co-ops from the Rochester Institute of Technology at IBM Rational in Raleigh, NC. Development continued through 2006, including some contributions from Andy Gianfagna. Ryan Lowe joined the team in mid-2006 to deploy and maintain an automated build system for the project. In November 2006, Kyle Shank and Matt Kent began working on an idea for a startup company, which would eventually become Persai. By March 2007, Kyle and Matt were devoting most of their spare time to Persai and had little time left to maintain RadRails. Kyle met with Aptana founder Paul Colton at EclipseCon 2007, and it became clear that handing over the project would be in the best interests of the RadRails community. On March 8, 2007 Aptana took over the project and renamed it to Aptana RadRails. Although RadRails is still an open source project, most work is now done by an Aptana employee: Christopher Williams, the lead developer of the RDT project that RadRails was built upon. RadRails 1.0 was released under an open source license on March 13, 2008, as a plug-in to Aptana Studio, an Eclipse-based IDE for Web and Ajax development that can run either standalone or within Eclipse.

== Books about Aptana RadRails ==
In May 2008, the book "Aptana RadRails: An IDE for Rails Development", written by Javier Ramírez, was published by Packt Publishing.

This book covers all the features of the Community Edition 1.0.
