= ObjecTime Developer =

ObjecTime Developer (or ObjecTime or OTD, for short) is a software automation tool designed to meet the development needs of real-time software development teams. The tool was created by ObjecTime Limited of Kanata, Ontario, and was aimed at aiding software developers in building applications using Real-Time Object-Oriented Modeling (ROOM) for real-time, graphical design models. ObjecTime, using the design models, will then generate production-quality applications for real-time operating systems, using the C and C++ programming languages. An important aspect of the development process using OTD was the capability to visually see the execution of the generated software as animation of the design models. This was true both for the software running both on the development or target platform.

The concepts behind the modeling language described in ROOM (actors and structure/state) was gradually incorporated into UML, first as a profile for real-time (capsules and structure/state) and then as an integral part of UML 2 (composite classes).

When Rational Software acquired ObjecTime Limited in 2000 their respective products — Rational Rose and ObjecTime Developer — were then merged into a product that was rechristened Rational Rose RealTime. This major changes resulted in the loss of a commercial implementation of ROOM. Today only the recently started Eclipse open source project eTrice is implementing ROOM.

== Literature ==
- Bran Selic, Garth Gullekson, Paul T. Ward: Real-Time Object-Oriented Modeling. Revised edition. MBSE4U, 2023, ISBN 978-3-9822235-4-4
