= JetBrains MPS =

Tool for creating custom programming languages

Meta Programming System
- Developer: JetBrains
- Stable release: 2022.2 (November 1, 2022)
- Operating system: Cross-platform
- License: Apache Software License 2.0
- Website: www.jetbrains.com/mps/
- Repository: github.com/JetBrains/MPS

JetBrains MPS (Meta Programming System) is a language workbench developed by JetBrains. MPS is a tool to design domain-specific languages (DSL). It uses projectional editing which allows users to overcome the limits of language parsers, and build DSL editors, such as ones with tables and diagrams.
It supports language-oriented programming. MPS is an environment for language definition, a language workbench, and integrated development environment (IDE) for such languages.

== Composable languages ==
While domain-specific language extensions can often be useful in general-purpose programming languages, their text-based nature means that adding domain-specific language extensions can lead to ambiguity in text-based syntax. MPS avoids this grammatical ambiguity by working with the abstract syntax tree directly. In order to edit this tree, a text-like projectional editor is used.

Because MPS directly uses the abstract syntax tree, MPS supports composable language definitions. This means that languages can be extended, and embedded, and these extensions can be used in the same program in MPS and will not conflict.

== Reusable language infrastructure ==
MPS provides a reusable language infrastructure which is configured with language definition languages. MPS also provides many IDE services automatically: editor, code completion, find usages, etc.

== Existing languages ==
- Base Language - 99% Java reimplemented with MPS. There are many extensions of this language
  - collections language
  - dates language
  - closures language
  - regular expressions language
- Language definition languages - these language are implemented with themselves, i.e. bootstrapped
  - structure language
  - editor language
  - constraints language
  - type system language
  - generator language

== MPS applications ==
=== Mbeddr ===
mbeddr is an embedded development system based on MPS. It has languages tailored to embedded development and formal methods:

- Core C language
- Components
- Physical units
- State machines

=== YouTrack ===
In October 2009, JetBrains released the YouTrack bug tracking system - the first commercial software product developed with MPS.

=== Realaxy editor ===
In April 2010, the Realaxy ActionScript Editor beta was released, the first commercial IDE based on the MPS platform.

=== PEoPL ===
PEoPL is a tool for software product line engineering realised in MPS.

=== GDF (Gamification Design Framework) ===
GDF is a framework for designing and deploying gameful applications. GDF consists of domain-specific languages allowing for stepwise refinement of application definitions, from higher levels of abstraction towards implementation code to be run on a gamification engine.

According to GDF's case study from Jetbrains, MPS was chosen for three main reasons: the need to provide text-based DSLs, the availability of language extension mechanisms conveying consistency management between abstraction layers, and the provision of generators to automatically derive implementation code.

== Licensing ==
The MPS source code is released under the Apache License.

== See also ==
- Xtext
