= Xtend =

General-purpose programming language

- Paradigm: Object-oriented, imperative, functional
- Designed by: Sven Efftinge, Sebastian Zarnekow
- Developer: typefox
- First appeared: 2011
- Stable release: 2.43.0 / May 25, 2026; 2 months ago
- Typing discipline: Static, strong, inferred
- Platform: Java Virtual Machine
- OS: Cross-platform
- License: Eclipse Public License
- Website: eclipse.dev/Xtext/xtend/

Influenced by
- Java, Scala, Groovy, Smalltalk, Xpand

Xtend is a general-purpose high-level programming language for the Java Virtual Machine. Syntactically and semantically, Xtend has its roots in the Java programming language but focuses on a more concise syntax and some additional functionality such as type inference, extension methods, and operator overloading. Being primarily an object-oriented language, it also integrates features known from functional programming, e.g. lambda expressions. Xtend is statically typed and uses Java's type system without modifications. It is compiled to Java code and thereby seamlessly integrates with all existing Java libraries.

The language Xtend and its IDE is developed as a project at Eclipse.org and participates in the annual Eclipse release train. The code is open source under the Eclipse Public License, allowing the language to be compiled and run independently of the Eclipse platform.

== History ==
Xtend originated from Xtext, which is the framework used to define the Xtend language and editor. Xtend was first released as part of Xtext in the Eclipse release Indigo in June 2011. Since the Eclipse release Juno (June 2012, Xtend version 2.3), Xtend has become a standalone project.

Xtend should not be confused with the older language with the same name in the Xpand project. Xtend was initially named Xtend2 for better distinction, with the "2" soon dropped for simplicity. With its template expressions, Xtend is meant as a replacement of the entire Xpand technology.

== Philosophy ==
Java is one of the most popular programming languages and has a large ecosystem of libraries and tools. However, some consider its syntax verbose, and some concepts are missing and only slowly added to the language. Xtend seeks to reduce syntactic noise and add new features to allow for shorter and better readable code than is possible with Java.

Xtend's syntax is close to Java's to make it easy to learn. Xtend maintains maximum compatibility with Java by compiling to Java code and using Java's type system; Java code and Xtend code can be mixed inside the same project at will.

Using a combination of lambda expressions and extension methods, the language can be extended by means of libraries, i.e. without changing the language itself. A small standard library makes heavy use of this.

The Eclipse-based Xtend IDE offers syntax highlighting, code completion, refactoring, navigation and debugging. It integrates with Eclipse's Java Development Toolkit.

== Semantics ==
Xtend resembles Java in many regards. Here is an example Xtend file:

package sample

import java.util.List

class Greeter {
  def greetThem(List<String> names) {
    for(name: names) {
      println(name.sayHello)
    }
  }

  def sayHello(String name) {
    'Hello ' + name + '!'
  }
}

Xtend provides type inference; i.e., the type of name and the return types of the methods can be inferred from the context. Classes and methods are public by default, while fields are private. Semicolons are optional.

The example also shows the method sayHello called as an extension method (i.e. like a feature of its first argument). Extension methods can also be provided by other classes or instances.

Instead of using the imperative for-loop, one could use a functional style lambda expression in square brackets and call the higher-order function forEach in extension syntax on the list:

def greetThem(List<String> names) {
  names.forEach [ println(sayHello) ]
}

Note that the lambda's parameter, if not specified, is called it, which can be skipped like this in Java. Its type is inferred as string. Lambda expressions are also automatically coerced to single method interfaces, such that they can be passed, e.g. as a java.lang.Comparable.

Template expressions are multi-line strings within triple quotes with interpolated values in French quotes. In the example above, one could write:

def sayHello(String name) '''
    Hello «name» !
'''

Xtend offers intelligent white-space management (the above text will not be indented in the output), thus meeting the requirements of code generation.

Further language features include multimethods, a powerful switch expression, and operator overloading by means of library methods.

== Bibliography ==
- Bettini, Lorenzo (2016). Implementing Domain-specific Languages with Xtext and Xtend (2nd ed.). Packt Publishing. ISBN 978-1-78646-496-5.
