= Connected Data Objects =

Connected Data Objects (CDO) is a free implementation of a Distributed Shared Model on top of the Eclipse Modeling Framework (EMF).

With CDO, programmers can easily enhance existing EMF models in such a way that they can be stored and subsequently maintained in a central model repository. While object relational mapping against a JDBC data source on the server side is the shipped default, CDO provides for pluggable storage adapters that allow you to develop and use different mappers (like Hibernate- or OODB-based). On the client side, CDO provides a default integration with EMF, the Eclipse Modeling Framework, although other model integrations on top of the CDO protocol are imaginable as well.

== Model integration features ==
- EMF integration at model level (as opposed to the edit level)
- Support for generated models (just switch two .genmodel properties)
- Support for dynamic models (just load .ecore file and commit to repository)
- Support for legacy models (for compiled models without access to .genmodel)
- Support for the Ecore meta model and descendants

== User interface features ==
- Eclipse view for working with CDO sessions, transactions, views and resources
- Package Manager dialog per session
- Eclipse editor for working with resources and objects

== Client side features ==
- Multiple sessions to multiple repositories on multiple servers
- Multiple transactions per session
- Multiple read-only views per session
- Multiple audit views per session (an audit is a view that shows a consistent, historical version of a repository)
- Multiple resources per view (a view is always associated with its own EMF ResourceSet)
- Inter-resource proxy resolution
- Multiple root objects per resource
- Object state shared among all views of a session
- Object graph internally unconnected (unused parts of the graph can easily be reclaimed by the garbage collector)
- Only new and modified objects committed in a transaction
- Transactions can span multiple resources
- Demand loading of objects (resources are populated as they are navigated)
- Partial loading of collections (chunk size can be configured per session)
- Adaptable pre-fetching of objects (different intelligent usage analyzers are available)
- Asynchronous object invalidation (optional)
- Clean API to work with sessions, views, transactions and objects
- CDOResources are EObjects as well
- Objects carry meta information like id, state, version and life span
- Support for OSGi environments (headless, Eclipse RCP, ...)
- Support for standalone applications (non-OSGi)

== Network protocol features ==
- Net4j based binary application protocol
- Pluggable transport layer (shipped with NIO socket transport and JVM embedded transport)
- Pluggable fail over support
- Pluggable authentication (shipped with challenge/response negotiation)
- Multiple acceptors per server

== Server side features ==
- Pluggable storage adapters
- Multiple repositories per server
- Multiple models (packages) per repository
- Multiple resources (instance documents) per repository
- Expressive XML configuration file
- Configurable storage adapter per repository (see below)
- Configurable caching per repository
- Clean API to work with repositories, sessions, views, transactions and revisions
- Support for OSGi environments (usually headless)
- Support for standalone applications (non-OSGi)

== DB store features ==
- Supports all optional features of the CDO Server
- Pluggable SQL dialect adapters
- Includes support for Derby, HSQLDB, MySQL and Oracle (TBD)
- Pluggable mapping strategies
- Includes horizontal mapping strategy (one table per concrete class)
- Includes vertical mapping strategy (TBD, one table per class in hierarchy)
- Supports different mapping modes for collections
