= Syntax Definition Formalism =

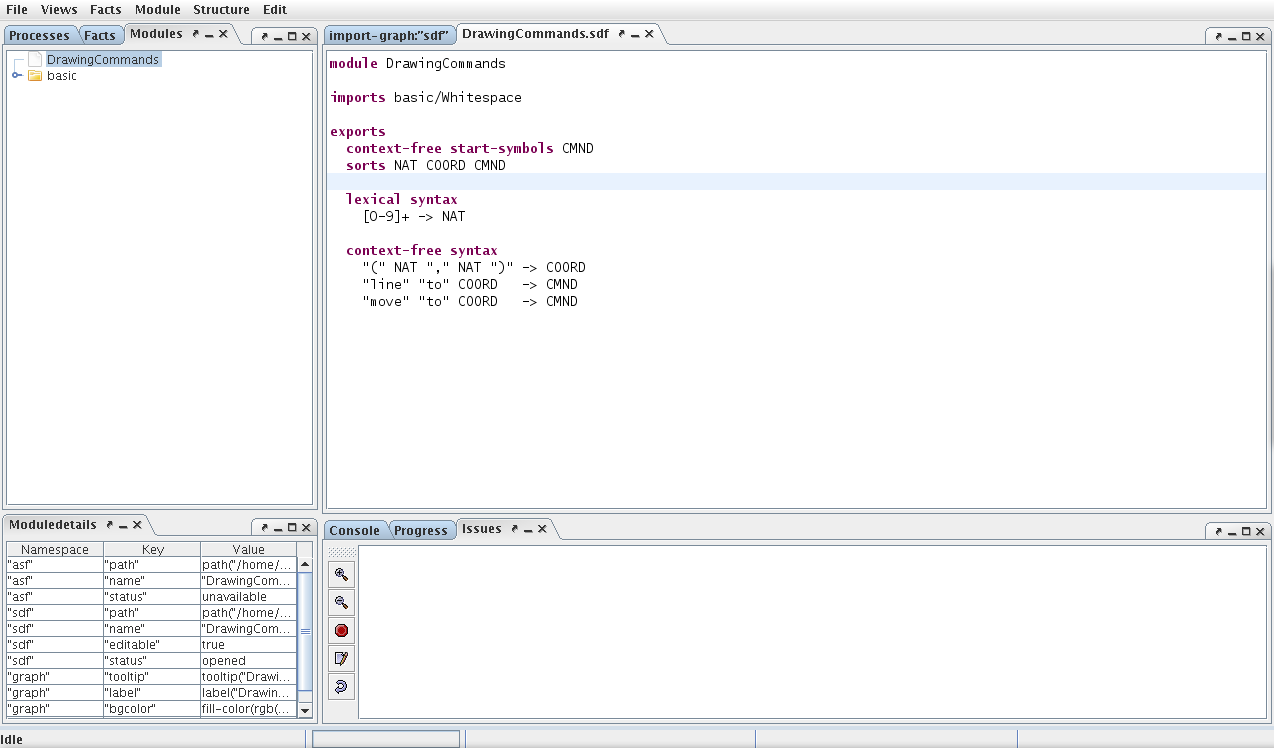
The ASF+SDF Meta-Environment, a toolset that provides a parser and parser generator for SDF

The Syntax Definition Formalism (SDF) is a metasyntax used to define context-free grammars: that is, a formal way to describe formal languages. It can express the entire range of context-free grammars. Its current version is SDF3. A parser and parser generator for SDF specifications are provided as part of the free ASF+SDF Meta Environment. These operate using the SGLR (Scannerless GLR parser). An SDF parser outputs parse trees or, in the case of ambiguities, parse forests.

== Overview ==
Features of SDF:

- Supports the entire range of context-free languages
- Allows modular syntax definitions (grammars can import subgrammars) which enables reuse
- Supports annotations

== Examples ==
The following example defines a simple Boolean expression syntax in SDF2:

module basic/Booleans

exports
  sorts Boolean
  context-free start-symbols Boolean

context-free syntax
   "true"                      -> Boolean
   "false"                     -> Boolean
   lhs:Boolean "|" rhs:Boolean -> Boolean {left}         
   lhs:Boolean "&" rhs:Boolean -> Boolean {left}       
   "not" "(" Boolean ")"       -> Boolean           
   "(" Boolean ")"             -> Boolean

 context-free priorities
   Boolean "&" Boolean -> Boolean >
   Boolean "|" Boolean -> Boolean

== Program analysis and transformation systems using SDF ==
- ASF+SDF Meta Environment provides SDF
- RascalMPL
- Spoofax/IMP
- Stratego/XT
- Strafunski

== See also ==
- GNU bison
- ANTLR
