= Xtext =

Open-source software framework

Eclipse Xtext
- Stable release: 2.31.0 / March 2, 2021; 5 years ago
- Type: Software framework
- License: Eclipse Public License
- Website: eclipse.dev/Xtext/
- Repository: github.com/eclipse-xtext/xtext

Xtext is an open-source software framework for developing programming languages and domain-specific languages (DSLs). Unlike standard parser generators, Xtext generates not only a parser, but also a class model for the abstract syntax tree, as well as providing a fully featured, customizable Eclipse-based IDE.

Xtext is being developed in the Eclipse Project as part of the Eclipse Modeling Framework Project. It is licensed under the Eclipse Public License.

== History ==
The first version of Xtext was published in 2006 in the openArchitectureWare project. The last version released under the oAW project was version 4.3. Since the beginning of 2008, Xtext has been developed at Eclipse under the Eclipse Modeling Project.

Joining Eclipse's annual simultaneous release, Xtext released version 0.7.0 (June 2009), 1.0 (June 2010), 2.0 (June 2011), 2.3 (June 2012), 2.5 (December 2013), 2.6 (May 2014) and 2.7 (September 2014). The framework is mainly developed by the German company Itemis.

== Functionality ==
To specify a language, the developer has to write a grammar in Xtext's grammar language. This grammar describes how an Ecore model is derived from a textual notation. From that definition, a code generator derives an ANTLR parser and the classes for the object model. Both can be used independently of Eclipse.

Xtext offers editor functionality like syntax highlighting, code completion, formatting, navigation to declaration, reference search, and error reporting. These features are based in part upon the language grammar and can be tailored to suit the needs of a specific language. The framework can also be used for syntax and cross references validation which helps developers to detect errors during the editing of the source files.

The framework defines how to integrate with the Eclipse IDE and editors based on the Language Server Protocol (LSP). It provides code generation capabilities that can be extended or replaced to add language-specific behaviour such as custom validation rules, code completion proposals, etc. This provides the flexibility for developers to get started using standard language tooling and then modify as a language's needs grow more complex.

Xtext includes features which integrate well with the Eclipse-based IDE:

- Syntax coloring
- Code completion
- Static analysis
- Outline view
- Source-code navigation
- Indexing
- Compare view
- Hovers
- Code folding
- Rename refactoring

Xtext languages and the IDE are highly configurable, as the language infrastructure and the IDE are wired up using dependency injection and Google Guice. The default components can be easily replaced by binding customized ones instead.

Since version 2.0, Xtext has facilitated the development of domain-specific languages for the Java virtual machine, referring to and compiling to Java artifacts with tight integration into Eclipse's Java Development Toolkit. A reusable expression languages library enables rich behavior within the DSL.

A code generator written in Xtend can be hooked in for any language. For JVM languages, it is enough to map the DSL concepts to Java artifacts to get holistic Java integration. An alternative interpreter is also available.

== Uses ==
At the time of writing this article, the Xtext homepage listed around 40 commercial and non-commercial projects from several application domains using Xtext.

- An implementation of AWK, the popular Domain Specific Language (DSL) is based on Xtext.
- The general-purpose language Xtend is also built with Xtext.

== Awards ==
- Eclipse Community Awards 2010: "Most Innovative New Feature or Eclipse Project"
- Sebastian Zarnekow, commiter, Eclipse Community Awards 2011: "Top Committer"
- Sven Efftinge, project lead, Eclipse Community Awards 2012: "Top Committer"

== See also ==
- JetBrains MPS

== Bibliography ==
- Sven Efftinge; Jan Köhnlein; Peter Friese. "Build your own textual DSL with Tools from the Eclipse Modeling Project". Eclipse Foundation.
- Sven Efftinge. "Fowler's DSL example with Xtext". sven efftinge's blog.
