= MaPS S.A. =

MaPS System
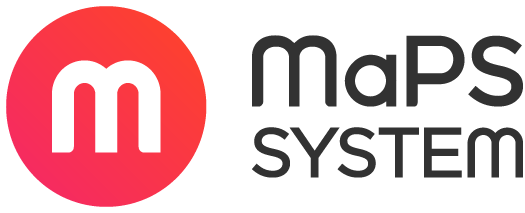
- Industry: PLC
- Founded: 2011
- Founder: Thierry Muller
- Headquarters: Luxembourg
- Area served: France, Luxembourg, Germany, Switzerland, Belgium
- Products: Product Information Management, Digital Asset Management, Master Data Management and Business Process Management

MaPS S.A. is a software editor founded in 2011 by Thierry Muller. The company is headquartered in Luxembourg. Its platform, called MaPS System, provides Data Management software for Multichannel Marketing.

== History and funding ==
The first version of MaPS System was released under the agency Prem1um S.A. in 2005 in the partnership with Pingroom agency. In combination with MaPS System, Prem1um also provided various consulting services in Marketing, Publishing and Sales. This is where MaPS System takes its names (M stands for Marketing, P for Publishing and S for Sales).

In 2011, after being successful, Prem1um S.A. decided to enable the software MaPS System to operate independently under MaPS S.A., as a separate company and editor of the software. The first financial supports were provided by Malta ICI, a Venture Capital firm, and the local partner Chameleon Invest, a seed-capital fund led by Business Angels, who invested €900,000. In a second investment round in 2014 led by Newion Investments, a Venture Capital firm, €1.4 Million were raised, thus amounting to total assets of €2.2 Million.

In 2016, the company was taken over by three private investors.

In 2018, after two years of continuous growth and European expansion in Belgium, Germany and Switzerland, MaPS S.A acquired Awevo, an e-commerce web agency.

== Products ==
The services included in MaPS System range from the data centralization, Data Governance to an optimized Multichannel Marketing. The software currently includes more than 35 modules for Master Data Management, Product Information Management, Digital Asset Management, Business Process Management including catalogue Publishing features.

== Certifications ==
In 2019, MaPS System and Awevo received "Made in Luxembourg" label, given to the companies whose services are entirely designed in Luxembourg, without any production or development offshoring.

MaPS System is a member of ICT Cluster by Luxinnovation.
