= Crasman =

Finnish e-commerce consultancy company

Crasman Oy
- Type: Private
- Industry: Digital commerce, IT consulting
- Founded: January 10, 1996; 30 years ago
- Headquarters: Helsinki, Finland
- Key people: Samuli Hokkanen (CEO)
- Revenue: €8.6 million (2024)
- Number of employees: 93 (2024)
- Website: www.crasman.fi

Crasman Oy is a Finnish digital commerce company founded on January 10, 1996. Headquartered in Helsinki, the company provides B2B and B2C e-commerce development, product information management (PIM), digital marketing and consulting services. The company is listed as a partner of Shopify, Akeneo, and Google Cloud.

== History ==
In 1998, the company began developing Crasmanager CMS, a content management system, using the LAMP software stack.

In 2003, Crasman launched Muistikuva.net, a mobile photo-sharing service that allowed users to upload images via MMS or email from mobile phones. It was featured as an interactive installation during the Night of the Arts (Taiteiden yö) festival in Helsinki in 2005 and 2006, where user-contributed photos were projected onto a screen at Lasipalatsi.

The Crasmanager CMS platform was subsequently used in several Finnish web projects, including a 2003 corporate website redesign for the media company Alma Media and a 2004 web service project for Electroline in Hong Kong. It was also deployed for internet and intranet services for the Finnish Civil Aviation Administration (Ilmailulaitos), the website renewal project for the Finnish Committee for UNICEF in 2006, and e-commerce sites for the tire retail chain Vianor in 22 countries.

In 2009, the Crasmanager 5.2 platform received a security certification from the cybersecurity consultancy firm Nixu Oy following a technical and operational process audit.

In 2010, Crasman acquired Aisti Medialab and its Bildy web-publishing tool. The company later introduced Crasman Stage, a Finnish content management system (CMS).

In 2013, Hans Valldén was appointed CEO, succeeding Pasi Kervinen, who became chairman of the board.

In 2017, Crasman opened an office in Tampere after acquiring the business operations of Suunnittelutoimisto Topic Oy. In 2018, the company opened an office at the Joensuu Science Park (Joensuun Tiedepuisto).

In 2019, a market review by North Patrol found that Crasman Stage accounted for 1.76 percent of the surveyed Finnish e-commerce platform market.

In 2022, Samuli Hokkanen was appointed CEO. In 2024, the company reported a turnover of €8.6 million and employed 93 people.
