= Censhare =

Web content management system

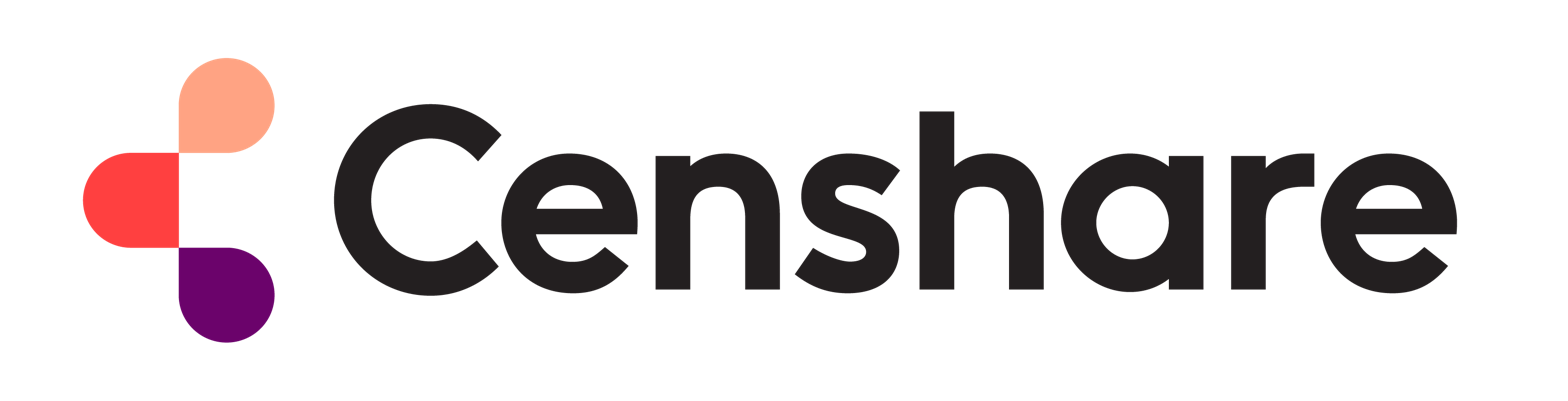
- Developer: Censhare GmbH
- Stable release: 2025.1 / May 2025
- Type: web content management system
- License: Proprietary
- Website: www.censhare.com

Censhare is a commercial Marketing Supply Chain platform that consists of a suite of cloud applications, including Product Information Management, Digital Asset Management, Content Management System (or Enterprise Content Management System (ECMS), and Marketing Resource Management (the last one is via native integration with Entirely portfolio company MARMIND). Censhare Gmbh is also an Entirely company owned by DuMont.

Censhare integrates all the entered digital assets (and their information) in a single system, organizes content, and automates the respective processes. The platform has a composable design, and it integrates the application's Collaboration and Process Management, Digital Asset Management, Product Information Management, Omnichannel Content Management, Brand Management, Content Management and integrates with MARMIND's Marketing Resource Management. Censhare is an Editorial System as well as a Web Content Management System.

Censhare is available on-premise and, since 2023, also in the cloud. It can be used for cross-media publishing of content in different media, such as Multi Format Publishing, Cross-Media Publishing and Multi Channel Publishing. The system is used in Media Houses, Retail & CPG, Manufacturing, Banking & Insurance, Media & Entertainment industries and other companies and institutions for the generation and output of content in conventional, standard communication media, as well as for corporate communication, marketing, brand management, multichannel marketing, the processing of sales publications and for collaboration. On a technical level, the content, templates, layouts, structures and user accounts are stored and managed separately in a patented central semantic graph database.

The Censhare marketing supply chain platform is regarded as a "Global Publishing" product and ranks among the eight leading publishing systems worldwide.

== Operations ==
Censhare GmbH has its headquarters in Germany in Munich, where the product is developed, and additional offices are in the United Kingdom, United States, Switzerland, France, Benelux, Nordics, and India.

== History ==
=== Product Development ===
The development of the system started in 2001 and was launched on the market in 2002 as CoWare Server. Since version 2.0 the system has been sold under the censhare name. In 2008 the production company CoWare AG was renamed as censhare AG.

The system consists of individual applications and is offered in different configurations all the way through to an "all-in-one" platform for communication and marketing. Main versions are usually issued every other year, minor versions are issued regularly three times a year, while updates are provided according to requirements.

Censhare launched the Censhare Cloud in January 2024, which provides the same functions and features as the on-premise version (Censhare Classic), but it is hosted by Censhare in Germany.

In addition to the further development of products, Censhare GmbH participates as official partner in the Adobe InDesign IDML development (InDesign Markup Language) of Adobe Systems.

=== History of versions ===
- CoWare Server 1.0 (2002): Market launch; Asset Management; Linking to the QuarkXPress layout application
- censhare 2.0 (2004): Page planning; Web Client; SAP interface; Linking to the layout applications Adobe InDesign and Adobe InCopy
- censhare 3.0 (2007): Translation with Translation Memory; Web Content Management System; Microsoft Word and Excel integration; Image Editor; Content Editor for XML and InCopy; Layout Editor; Linking to the Adobe InDesign Server and Adobe FrameMaker applications
- censhare 4.0 (2010): Embedded data base in the application server, faceted searching, geographic coordinates with map view, service client
- censhare 5.0 (2014): HTML5 - based client with Desktop and Tablet support, Marketing Resource Management
- censhare 5.1 (2015): Targeting, Web-to-Print, Online News and Media Portal
- ...
- censhare 2020.1 (2020)
- censhare 2023.1 (October 2023)
- censhare 2024.1 (June 2024)

== Utilization ==
The Censhare system is a commercial system and is for sale as a solution configured according to requirements and provides the required licenses accordingly. In addition, since May 2009, various communication products are available like Censhare SaaS according to the SaaS model at monthly rental prices, whereby the terms range from 12 to 48 months.

== Market ==
The Censhare system is currently (2024) used by more than 300 national and international companies and institutions. Customers include media companies such as book publishing companies, corporate publishers, specialist publishers, magazine and newspaper publishing companies as well as financial services providers, agencies, media services providers, public administrations and companies active in the industrial and commercial sectors. The system is currently used by the following corporations, for example:

- Dyson Ltd. - UK
- IHG Hotels & Resorts- US
- Hearst Magazines - UK
- Deutsche Bank AG - DE
- Illumination - US
- Kohl's - US
- Rewe Group - DE
- Vitra AG - CH
- Grupo Anaya - ES
- NBC Universal - US
- IKEA - US

== Awards ==
- EDP Digital Press Award 2009, Software category
- Gartner Inc.: Cool Vendor for Content Management 2014

== Literature ==
Studies

- Sabrina Saturna, Stefan Krüger (editors); Svenja Hagenhoff, Ehrhardt F. Heinold (Hrsg.): Marktstudie zu Crossmedialen Redaktionssystemen. Heinold, Spiller & Partner, Hamburg 2009, S. 46–47 (German; online at University Göttingen).
- Erik Vlietinck: Publishing Systems Functionality Matrix & Completeness of Vision Diagram. Annotations & Observations. Appeared in the online specialist magazine IT Enquirer Reports, 2009.

Trade and specialist articles

- Redaktionssysteme. In: PrePress – World of Print, issue 10/2011, ISSN 1868-9779, S. 30–33 (German; digital copy, PDF file, 412 KB).
- Censhare: Distribuzione e pubblicazione dei contenuti senza intermediari. In: Italia grafica, issue April 2011, S. 39 (Italian; digital copy, PDF file, 112 KB).
- Luca Leonardi: Speciale: Gestione Contenuti. In: Italia grafica, issue February 2011, S. 26–41 (Italian; digital copy, PDF file, 937 KB).
- Intelligente Workflows. Zukunftstechnik heute nutzen: mit censhare 4. In: Facts – cpwissen, publish to go, January 2011 (German).
- Petra Ebeling: Censhare 4.0 mit neuer Struktur. Neues Konzept für Publishing, Kommunikation und Kollaboration. In: Deutscher Drucker, issue Nr. 30, 2010, ISSN 0012-1096 (German; online at print.de).
- Berichten wie die Publisher. Versicherer Debeka setzt auf censhare für Geschäftsberichte. In: CP Monitor, issue 3/10, ISSN 1868-4661, S. 46–47 (German; Digitalisat, PDF file, 171 KB).
- censhare für kooperatives Publizieren. In: CP Monitor, issue 2/10, ISSN 1868-4661, S. 7–9 (German; Digitalisat, PDF file, 321 KB).
- Driving Dyson's brand assets. In: brand management, issue Summer 2009, S. 54–56 (Digital copy, PDF file, 147 KB).
- Eva-Susanne Krah: Corporate Publishing im Vertrieb. Produktivität gesteigert, Kosten reduziert. In: Sales-Business, issue June 2009, S. 46–47 (German; digital copy, PDF file, 181 KB).
- Natmags' workflow and DAM grail. In: Print Media Mag, issue June 2009, S. 38–40.
