= Worldspreads =

Worldspreads Group
- Company type: Public company
- Traded as: AIM:WSPR
- Industry: Financial services
- Founded: 2000
- Defunct: 2012
- Fate: Special administration
- Headquarters: Dublin, Ireland
- Services: Online trading, CFDs, Spread Betting
- Number of employees: 66
- Website: www.worldspreads.com

Worldspreads was a financial spread trading company registered in Ireland but operating from London that offered trading on financial markets. The company became bankrupt in March 2012 after it was reported that the company did not have enough funds to meet its client liabilities. There were reports that it had been misusing client funds and not keeping them segregated as required under its license, possible for a number of years prior to its demise. The failure of the business generated criticism of regulators and auditors for not having spotted the activity.

== History ==
The company was founded in 2000 as a sports spread betting business. It went on to expand into financial spread trading which became the dominant part of its business.

The company sold the Irish part of its business to a group of local manager for €9.9M in 2007.

In 2008 it relocated the bulk of its operations to London from Dublin and listed on the London-based Alternative Investment Market (AIM) and obtained a license from the UK Financial Services Authority. It expanded over the following few years opening offices in a number of European countries and growing its market share of the UK financial spread betting market.

=== Bankruptcy ===
On 19 March 2012 Worldpsreads entered administration. On that date it appeared that there was only £16.6m of the £29.7m of customer money left that should have been in the business to cover customer balances.

Worldspreads had over 5000 spread betting customers at the point it went in special administration. Almost all clients were covered under the UK Financial Services Compensation Scheme and were paid compensation by the scheme.
