= Hôtel de la Marine (Nantes) =

Historic building in Nantes, France

Coordinates: 47°12′42″N 1°34′33″W

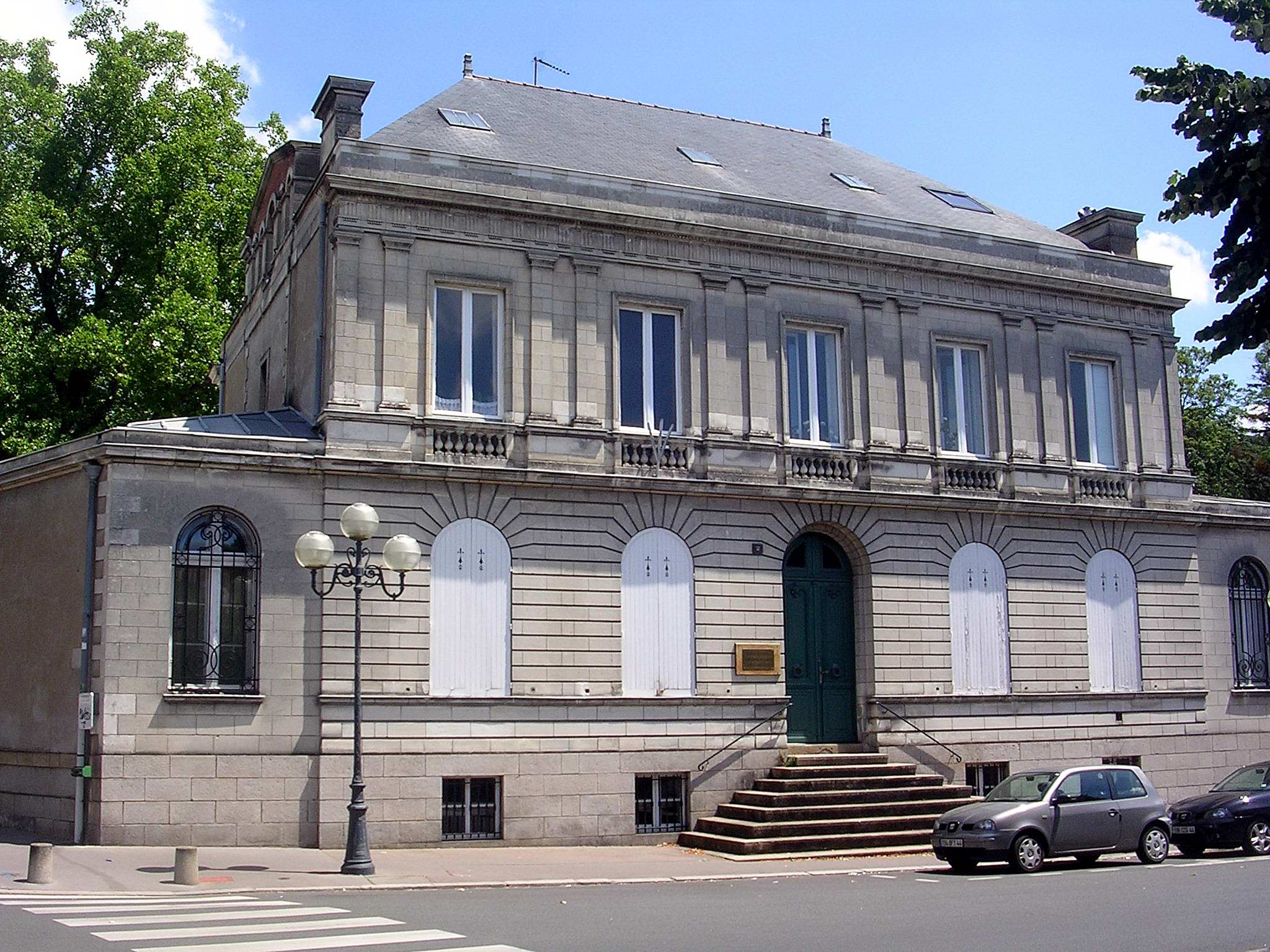
Hôtel de la Marine

The Hôtel de la Marine, originally called Hôtel Massion, is a neo-classical and "neo-Louis-XV" style private mansion (hôtel particulier) built in 1874, located in Nantes, France, at 2 Place Général-Mellinet between the boulevard Paul-Langevin and rue de Belleville, in the Dervallières neighborhood (which is in the Zola district). The building was listed as a French Monument historique (historical monument) in 1988 and 2011.

== History ==
The building was built in 1874.

The residence has 871 m^{2} of surface area. It is the last of the eight residences built on the square, and like the other seven it respects the design imposed by the architects Étienne Blon and Louis Amouroux in 1828. The successive owners were Gustave Massion (who gave the building its original name and who was a raffineur), the Loynes sisters, and Georges Hailaust (who was a wood merchant and settled in 1919).

The residence has a garden of 4407 m^{2}. It contains a rose garden and exotic trees (Himalayan and Atlas cedars, Virginia tulip trees, redwood, Magnolias) planted between 1874 and 1890.

At the end of the 20th century, this hotel housed the Regional Directorate of Taxes.

The facade of the Hôtel de la Marine is listed as a historic monument by decree of October 24, 1988, the garden, a staircase and the lounges by decree of August 29, 2011.

The Akeneo company has occupied the Hôtel de la Marine since April 2016. Additionally the residence has a smaller building in the back of the garden that hosts the in-house pub named Chaquip. This pub is managed by an association of individuals from Akeneo and has strict rules about alcohol consumption.

== Architecture ==
The hotel is built in granite and freestone.

On the square side, the facade respects the standard established in 1828 by the architects Étienne Blon and Louis Amouroux. Eugène Démangeat, the architect of the Hôtel de la Marine, created a ground floor with shear walls, due to uneven ground. The facade of the floor has five windows with, on each side, twin pilasters. The top of the facade ends with an entablature of triglyphs and metopes. The roof is made of slate.

On the garden side, the architect, freed from the constraint governing buildings overlooking the square, designed a facade in a "neo-Louis XV" style. The first floor has a long balcony with iron railings. The windows are embellished with mascarons.
