= System of record =

Data management term for storage system

A system of record (SOR) or source system of record (SSoR) is a data management term for an information storage system (commonly implemented on a computer system running a database management system) that is the authoritative data source for a given data element or piece of information, like for example a row (or record) in a table. In data vault it is referred to as the record source.

== Background ==
The need to identify systems of record can become acute in organizations where management information systems have been built by taking output data from multiple source systems, re-processing this data, and then re-presenting the result for a new business use.

In these cases, multiple information systems may disagree about the same piece of information. These disagreements may stem from semantic differences, differences in opinion, use of different sources, differences in the timing of the extract, transform, load processes that create the data they report against, or may simply be the result of bugs.

== Use ==
The integrity and validity of any data set is open to question when there is no traceable connection to a good source, and listing a source system of record is a solution to this. Where the integrity of the data is vital, if there is an agreed system of record, the data element must either be linked to, or extracted directly from it. In other cases, the provenance and estimated data quality should be documented.

The "system of record" approach is a good fit for environments where both:

- there is a single authority over all data consumers, and
- all consumers have similar needs

== Trade-offs ==
In diverse environments, one instead needs to support the presence of multiple opinions. Consumers may accept different authorities or may differ on what constitutes an authoritative source—researchers may prefer carefully vetted data, while tactical military systems may require the most recent credible report.

== See also ==
- Golden record (informatics), the master version or valid version of a data element in a single source of truth system
- Master data management, defining the handling of master data
- Privacy Act of 1974, U.S. law including requirement for agencies to publish System Of Records Notices (SORN) in the Federal Register to identify the system and describe the use of individuals' data.
- Single source of truth, practice of using one source for a particular data element
