= Akeneo =

Technology company

- Genre: Product information management
- Founded: 2013
- Founders: Frédéric de Gombert, Benoit Jacquemont, Nicolas Dupont and Yoav Kutner
- Headquarters: Nantes, France
- Area served: Worldwide
- Key people: Romain Fouache, CEO
- Number of employees: 400+
- Website: akeneo.com

Akeneo is a technology company that develops product information management (PIM) and product data intelligence software to scale business and improve customer experience. Akeneo is headquartered in Nantes, France and has offices in the United States, United Kingdom, Germany, Italy, the Netherlands and Australia with more than 400 employees. It has worked with customers including Shop.com, Fossil, Midland Scientific, Air Liquide, Rexel, Babolat, LVMH and Auchan.

== History ==
Before founding Akeneo, Frédéric de Gombert, Benoit Jacquemont and Nicolas Dupont had worked together at the open source company, Smile. They began developing a single product database to compete with Excel and brought Yoav Kutner onboard in founding Akeneo. The name comes from the Greek word akene, like the achenes' fruits that contains all the fruits' information and spread them along the winds. The company started producing a system for managing product information for use across distribution channels. The first public beta of Akeneo PIM was released in September 2013.

Akeneo was a co-founder and partner of the Open Source School created by Smile and the École privée des sciences informatiques. The company also opened offices in Düsseldorf, Germany and Boston, Massachusetts during early 2016.

Akeneo expanded into Israel after acquiring Sigmento, product data automation startup company. The acquisition worked to merge Sigmento's technology with Akeneo's products for data enrichment automation. The company also opened offices in Spain, Poland and the United Kingdom during early 2018. By late 2018, Akeneo had partnered with Magento to integrate its PIM software with the e-commerce system.

In March 2019, the company expanded into Italy and later announced that it would be opening an office in Australia in 2020.

In September 2023, it was announced Akeneo had acquired the AI data collection, cleansing, categorisation and enrichment platform, Unifai.

In October 2024, Romain Fouache was announced as the company's next chief executive officer. He was previously the chief operating officer and chief revenue officer at Dataiku, an artificial intelligence and machine learning company. Fouache assumed the role in November 2024 and stated that the company would develop new products through AI to optimize its customers' product experience.

In February 2026, Akeneo partnered with Stripe, Inc. to activate product data for agentic commerce.

== Funding ==
KIMA Venture and Nestadio Capital contributed €350,000 to the company in 2013. In September 2014, Akeneo received initial funding of $2.3 million led by Alven Capital. The company raised a Series B funding round of $13 million led by Partech Ventures in March 2017. Salesforce Ventures made a strategic investment in the company as it continued to expand in North America. It completed a $46 million Series C funding round in September 2019 led by Summit Partners.

A $135 million Series D funding was completed in March 2022, led by Summit Partners.

== Products ==
Akeneo's products include two versions of its open-source PIM software: a free community edition (CE) as well as an enterprise software as a service (SaaS). Akeneo PIM open source software is built under license OSL 3.0 and written in PHP.

In February 2020, the company released PIM 4.0 that included features such an asset manager, data quality insights, product attribute mapping and connection management by using API-based integration.

It released Akeneo Product Cloud, a SaaS platform that uses generative AI to organize and manage product information, in 2022.
