= Storming =

Storming, a term originating from storm may refer to:

- Storming or laying siege of a city, fortress or seat of power
- Storming, one of the four stages of the forming–storming–norming–performing Tuckman Model of group development
- "Storming", an episode in series 5 of Clarkson's Farm

== See also ==
- Brainstorming, a group of people interacting to spontaneously suggest ideas
- Event storming, a process in software development
- Strömming, Swedish name for the Baltic herring
- Storm (disambiguation)
