= OpenMDX =

Open-source model-driven architecture

- Developers: Werner Froidevaux, Harald Burger, Andy Nyffenegger, Chris Mueller, at OMEX AG.
- Stable release: 2.13.0 / August 1, 2014
- Written in: Java
- Operating system: Cross-platform
- Type: Software framework
- License: BSD
- Website: http://www.openmdx.org/
- Repository: github.com/openmdx/openmdx

OpenMDX is an open-source model-driven architecture (MDA) software platform, a framework suited for domain-driven design (DDD). It is based on the Object Management Group's MDA standards. OpenMDX supports Java SE, Java EE, and .NET runtime environments. openMDX enables software architects and developers to build and integrate software applications in an automated and industrialized way.
