= AI-assisted virtualization software =

AI-assisted virtualization software is a type of technology that combines the principles of virtualization with advanced artificial intelligence (AI) algorithms. This software is designed to improve efficiency and management of virtual environments and resources. This technology has been used in cloud computing and for various industries.

== History ==
Virtualization originated in mainframe computers in the 1960s in order to divide system resources between different applications. The term has since broadened.

The use of AI in virtualization significantly increased in the early 2020s.

== Uses ==
AI-assisted virtualization software uses AI-related technology such as machine learning, deep learning, and neural networks to attempt to make more accurate predictions and decisions regarding the management of virtual environments. Features include intelligent automation, predictive analytics, and dynamic resource allocation.

- Intelligent Automation: Automating tasks such as resource provisioning and routine maintenance. The AI learns from ongoing operations and can predict and perform necessary tasks autonomously.
- Predictive Analytics: Utilizing AI to analyze data patterns and trends, predicting future issues or resource requirements. It aids in proactive management and mitigation of potential problems.
- Dynamic Resource Allocation: Through the analysis of real-time and historical data, the AI system dynamically assigns resources based on demand and need, optimizing overall system performance and reducing wastage.

AI-assisted virtualization software has been used in cloud computing to optimize the use of resources and reduce costs. In healthcare, these technologies have been used to create virtual patient profiles. They are also used in data centers to improve performance and energy efficiency. It has also been used in network function virtualization (NFV) to improve virtual network infrastructure.

Implementing this type of software requires a high degree of technological sophistication and can incur significant costs. There are also concerns about the risks associated with AI, such as algorithmic bias and security vulnerabilities. Additionally, there are issues related to governance, the ethics of artificial intelligence, and regulations of AI technologies.
