= Single customer view =

Representation of the data known by an organization about its customers

A single customer view, also known as a golden profile, is an aggregated, consistent and holistic representation of the data held by an organisation about its customers, that can be viewed in one place, such as a single page.

== Applications ==
Single customer views allow organisations to analyse past behaviour in order to better target and personalise future customer interactions. A single customer view is also considered especially relevant where organisations engage with customers through multichannel marketing, since customers expect those interactions to reflect a consistent understanding of their history and preferences. However, some commentators have challenged the idea that a single view of customers across an entire organisation is either natural or meaningful, proposing that the priority should instead be consistency between the multiple views that arise in different contexts.

== Challenges ==
Where representations of a customer are held in more than one data set, achieving a single customer view can be difficult. Customer identity must be traceable between the records held in those systems, and anomalies or discrepancies in the customer data must be data cleansed for data quality. The acquisition by an organisation of a single customer view is one potential outcome of successful master data management. In December 2010, maintaining a single customer view, and submitting it within 72 hours, became mandatory for financial institutions in the United Kingdom due to new rules introduced by the Financial Services Compensation Scheme. In December 2025, the submission of a single record requirement was changed from 72 hours to 24 hours, by the Bank of England's Prudential Regulation Authority.

Privacy researchers have also criticized data collection efforts.

== See also ==
- Data warehouse
