= Financial Services Compensation Scheme =

UK government agency

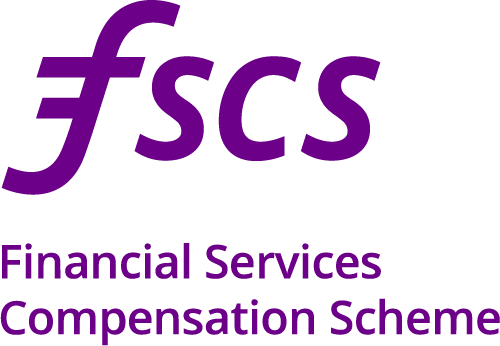

Deposit Guarantee Scheme overview
- Formed: 2001; 25 years ago
- Jurisdiction: United Kingdom
- Headquarters: 15 St Botolph Street, EC3A 7QU London
- Annual budget: £103.6m (2025/26)
- Deposit Guarantee Scheme executives: Martyn Beauchamp, Chief Executive Officer; Elizabeth Passey, Chair
- Website: www.fscs.org.uk

The Financial Services Compensation Scheme (FSCS) is the UK's statutory compensation scheme for customers of UK authorised financial services firms. This means it can step in to pay compensation if a firm is unable, or likely to be unable, to pay claims against it. Compensation can be in any form and by any method it determines is appropriate. It is an operationally independent body, set up under the Financial Services and Markets Act 2000 and funded by a levy on authorised financial services firms.

The rules of the FSCS are made by the Financial Conduct Authority (FCA) and are contained in its handbook. The FSCS board of directors is appointed by and ultimately accountable to the FCA. It covers deposits, insurance, debt management, funeral plans, investments, pensions, mortgages and payment protection insurance to varying amounts.

FSCS is free for consumers to use and, since 2001, has helped more than 4.5 million people and paid out more than £26 billion. Since 31 December 2010, maintaining a single customer view has become mandatory for United Kingdom banks and other deposit takers due to rules it introduced.

There is currently a review on whether to increase insurance coverage from the current 90% to 100%, in order to align it with the rest of the protection regime.

== History ==
The FSCS came into existence in 2001 and replaced multiple former schemes. Between 2001 and 2006 the scheme paid out close to £1 billion in compensation. In the period from 2006 to 2011, which included the 2008 financial crisis, compensation of over £26 billion was paid out by the FSCS. In 2008 the FSCS was given a loan by the Bank of England in order to be able to guarantee the deposits of customers of Bradford & Bingley. The compensation limits were last revised in 2010 to bring them into line with the EU (and EEA) deposit guarantee requirements under the European Union directive 94/19/E.

On 31 August 2012 UK authorised banks, building societies and credit unions were required to display information about FSCS protection in branch and online, this included posters and window stickers. This action followed the introduction of new Financial Services Authority (FSA) rules obliging deposit takers to display information about FSCS protection available to consumers. The UK branches of foreign banks from the European Economic Area (EEA) have to specify that their customers are not covered by FSCS and clearly state which national scheme provides protection.

On 14 January 2013 FSCS launched a consumer awareness programme, aiming to reassure consumers and boost confidence, thereby aiding financial stability. It follows on from the disclosure requirements and uses icons of protection to engage with the consumers and highlight the safety FSCS provides to savings and deposits.

== Funding ==
The FSCS is funded by levies on firms authorised by the Prudential Regulation Authority and the Financial Conduct Authority. FSCS's costs are made up of management expenses and compensation payments.

== Bank, building society or credit union insolvency ==
The Financial Services Compensation Scheme (FSCS) protects eligible deposits held with UK-authorised banks, building societies, and credit unions. From 1 December 2025, the deposit protection limit was increased from £85,000 to £120,000 per person, per authorised firm. If deposits or savings are in a joint account, the amount of FSCS protection is now £120,000 per eligible person. FSCS protection for deposits is free and automatic. If a bank, building society or credit union is deemed to be insolvent or at the risk of insolvency, FSCS will automatically pay compensation to its customers. In the vast majority of cases, savings are refunded in less than 7 days.

The deposit protection increase which took place on 1 December 2025 was the first inflationary uplift for eight years. It has been made possible only by Brexit, since when the UK was a member of the EU the guarantee limit had to be set at a sterling amount equivalent to EUR 100,000.

Since 3 July 2015 some types of temporary high balances of up to £1,000,000 have been protected for up to six months. From 1 December 2025, this protection was increased to £1,400,000 for the same six-month period.

== Compensation limits ==
	Percentages	Maximum Compensation
Deposits	100% of the first £120,000 per person per authorised firm (for claims against firms declared in default from 1 December 2025) 100% of the first £85,000 per person per authorised firm (for claims against firms declared in default from 30 January 2017)	£85,000 *£120,000 from 1 December 2025
Investments	100% of the first £85,000 per person per firm (for claims against firms declared in default from 1 April 2019).	£85,000
Mortgage advice and arranging	100% of the first £50,000 per person per firm (for claims against firms declared in default from 1 January 2010).	£50,000
Insurance Business (e.g. pensions, life assurance, home and travel)	90% of the claim with no upper limit. Compulsory insurance is protected in full.	Unlimited
General insurance advice and arranging (for business conducted on or after 14 January 2005).	90% of the claim with no upper limit. Compulsory insurance is protected in full.	Unlimited
Funeral plans	100% of the first £85,000 per person per authorised firm (for claims against firms declared in default on or after 29 July 2022)	£85,000
Long-term insurance (e.g. Whole of life assurance, Term life insurance and/or critical illness insurance)	100% of the claim with no upper limit	Unlimited
