= EPSI =

The École privée des sciences informatiques (EPSI) is a French private school specialized in information technology. EPSI was founded by professionals. The first school was based in Paris. Later on, with the rise of the computer science industry, the school built branches in Bordeaux, Montpellier, Arras then in October 2002 in Nantes and then later in Lyon.

== Information about the Administration ==
Director : Laurent ESPINE

Date of Creation : September 1961

Status : IT Private School

State recognition : The diploma is recognised by the French state : (Journal officiel du 9 septembre 1998)

== Applying to EPSI ==
- Profile examination
- Meeting
- Written tests (psychotechnical)

=== Level needed to Apply ===
A level to apply for the BTS (equivalent to HND) degree

The A Level or equivalent diploma is needed to apply for the BTS.

A Bac + 2 (2-year undergraduate degree) is required for the Bachelor (1-year program).

A Bac + 3 (3-year undergraduate degree) is required for the Engineering degree (2-year program).

== Academic Curriculum ==
- Number of years of study
  - 2 years for the BTS
  - 1 year for the Bachelor
  - 2 years for the engineering degree (CSII)
- Approved diplomas by French State :
  - BTS Services Informatiques aux Organisations Solutions logicielles et applications métier
  - BTS Services Informatiques aux Organisations Solutions d’infrastructure, systèmes et réseaux
  - Titre RNCP Niveau II Administrateur Système Réseaux et Bases de Données (Bachelor)
  - Titre RNCP Niveau II Concepteur développeur informatique (Bachelor)
  - Titre RNCP Niveau I Expert en Informatique et Système d’information (engineering degree)
- University equivalence
  - Bac + 2 for the BTS
  - Bac + 3 for the Bachelor
  - Bac + 5 for the computer science engineering degree

== About the school ==
- Number of Students : 1200 (2005, in the 6 E.P.S.I. sites)
- Number of diplomas given per year : 120
- Number of foreign students : 27
- Permanent teachers : 12
- Associate teachers : 72
