= Midland Scientific =

Laboratory products distributor

Midland Scientific Inc
- Company type: Private company
- Industry: Laboratory products distributor
- Founded: 1975
- Headquarters: Omaha, Nebraska, United States
- Key people: Vivian L. Pappel; President
- Products: Chemicals, reagents, measurement equipment, instrumentation
- Website: www.midlandsci.com

Midland Scientific is a woman-owned, full-line laboratory products distributor with offices in Nebraska, Iowa, Colorado, South Dakota, and Texas. Midland Scientific is a provider of laboratory supplies including chemicals, reagents, solutions, glassware, plasticware, biological media, instrumentation, measurement equipment, general laboratory supplies and laboratory consumables. Midland Scientific serves the food and beverage, industrial, educational, ethanol, and research markets with North American sales coverage. The company has warehouses in Omaha, Nebraska; Davenport, Iowa; Denver, Colorado; Rapid City, South Dakota; Bozeman, Montana and San Antonio, Texas. Midland Scientific is headquartered in Omaha, Nebraska and serves customers across North America.

== History ==
Midland Scientific was founded on April 1, 1975, in Omaha, Nebraska. Former employees of Mallinckrodt and Monsanto of St Louis, MO partnered to form Midland Scientific. The company’s objective was to meet the dynamic needs of industrial and commercial laboratories in the Upper Midwest. A warehouse and office were opened in Davenport, IA in 1977. In 2004, Midland Scientific became woman-owned.

Midland Scientific originally sold only Mallinckrodt Laboratory chemicals. Today, Midland Scientific has grown into a full line distributor of laboratory equipment, supplies and chemicals, representing over 200 manufacturers.

Midland Scientific has expanded to include a diverse base of customers across North America; however the typical customer is in the industrial, agricultural, ethanol, or food industries which are common in the Upper Midwest.
