= Golden record (informatics) =

In informatics, a golden record is the valid version of a data element (record) in a single source of truth system. It may refer to a database, specific table or data field, or any unit of information used. A golden copy is a consolidated data set, and is supposed to provide a single source of truth and a "well-defined version of all the data entities in an organizational ecosystem". Other names sometimes used include master source or master version.

The term has been used in conjunction with data quality, master data management, and similar topics. (Different technical solutions exist, see master data management).

== Master data ==
In master data management (MDM), the golden copy refers to the master data (master version) of the reference data which works as an authoritative source for the "truth" for all applications in a given IT landscape.

== See also ==
- Single source of truth
- Single version of the truth
