= Event storming =

Collaborative method for modeling software systems

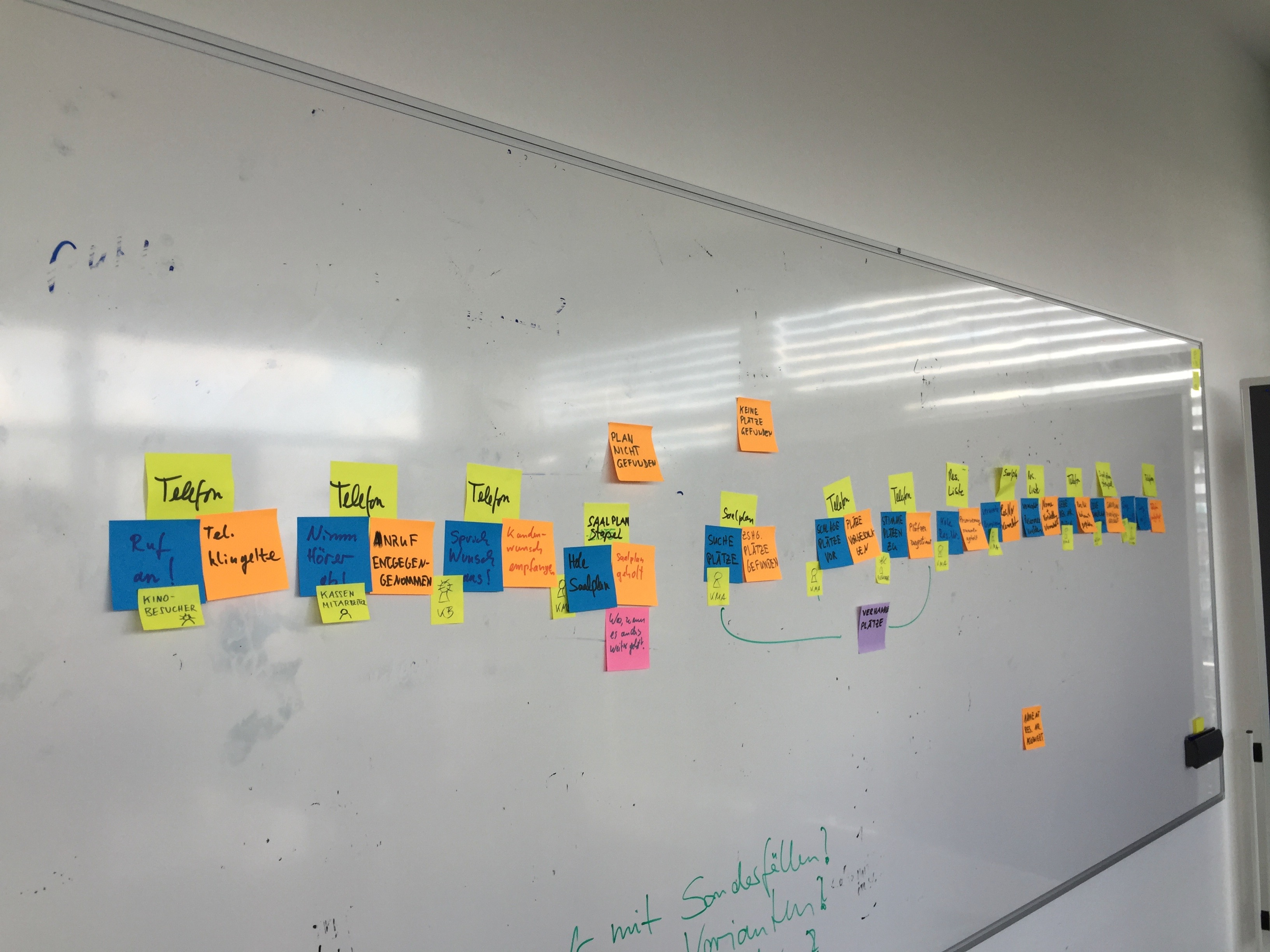
An example process from an EventStorming

EventStorming is a workshop-based method to quickly find out what is happening in the domain of a software program. Compared to other methods it is extremely lightweight and intentionally requires no support by a computer. The result is expressed in sticky notes on a wide wall.

The business process is "stormed out" as a series of domain events which are denoted as orange stickies. It was invented by Alberto Brandolini in the context of domain-driven design (DDD). The initial name, “Event-based modelling”, originates from Vaughn Vernon’s IDDD Tour, where Alberto Brandolini was a guest trainer. The term “Event-based” was already used in Vaughn’s material, so a last-minute name change happened just before going on stage in Leuwen, and EventStorming was born.

The official spelling is a single word: EventStorming, not Event Storming.

EventStorming can be used as a means for business process modeling and requirements engineering. The idea is to bring together software developers and domain experts and learn from each other. The name was chosen to show that the focus should be on the domain events and the method works similar to brainstorming or agile modeling's model storming.

== Requirements ==
It is important for an EventStorming workshop to have the right people present. This includes people who know the questions to ask (typically developers) and those who know the answers (domain experts, product owners).

The modeling will be placed on a wide wall with a roll of paper rolled out on it. The sticky notes will be placed on this paper. You will require at least 5 distinct colors for the sticky notes.

== Steps ==
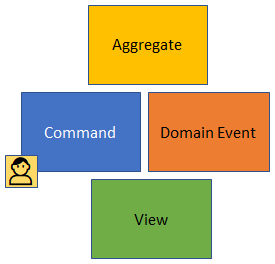
EventStorming legend of notes by their conceptual name with their associated colors and how they are laid out in relation to each other.

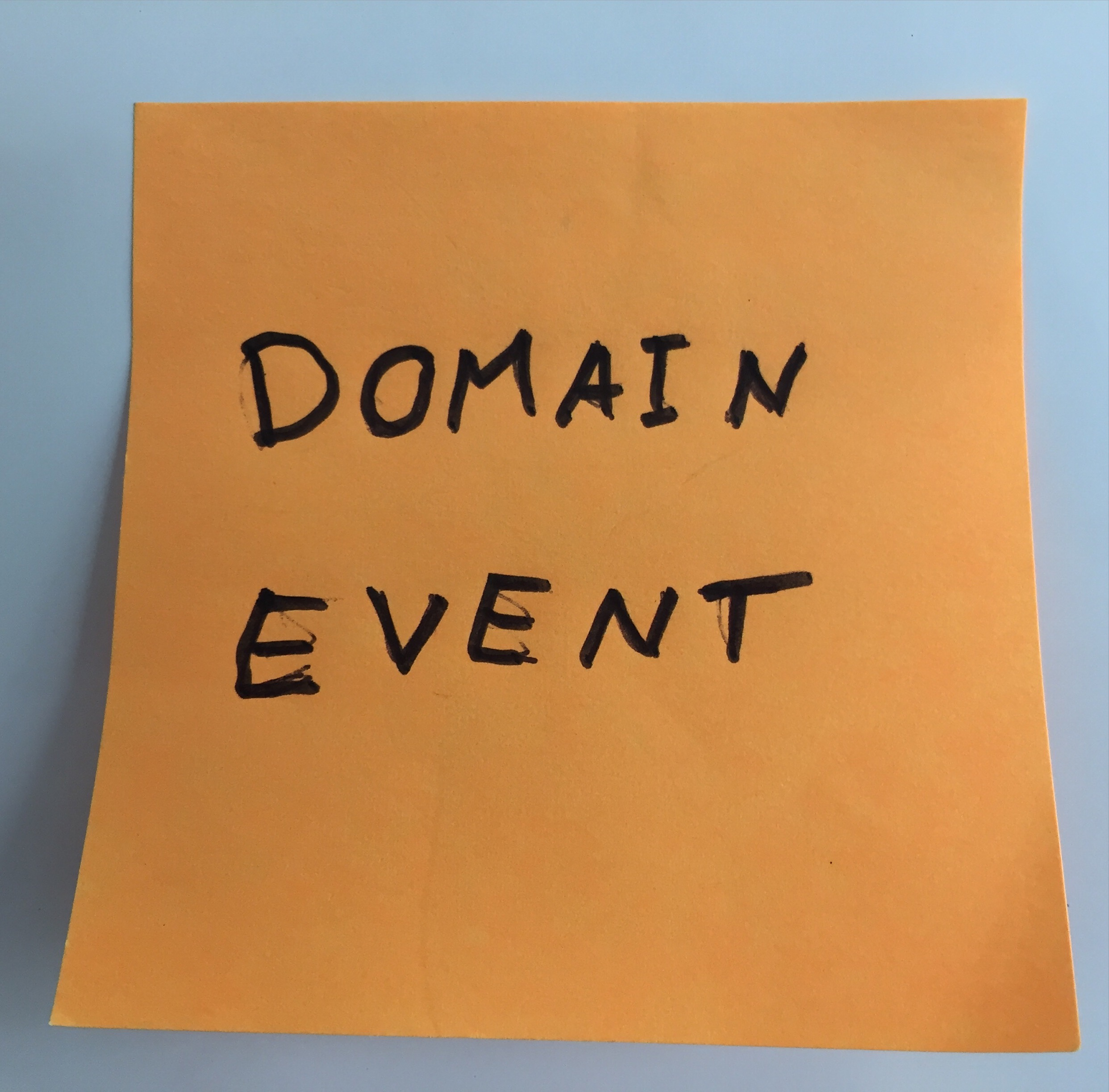
Step 1: Create domain events

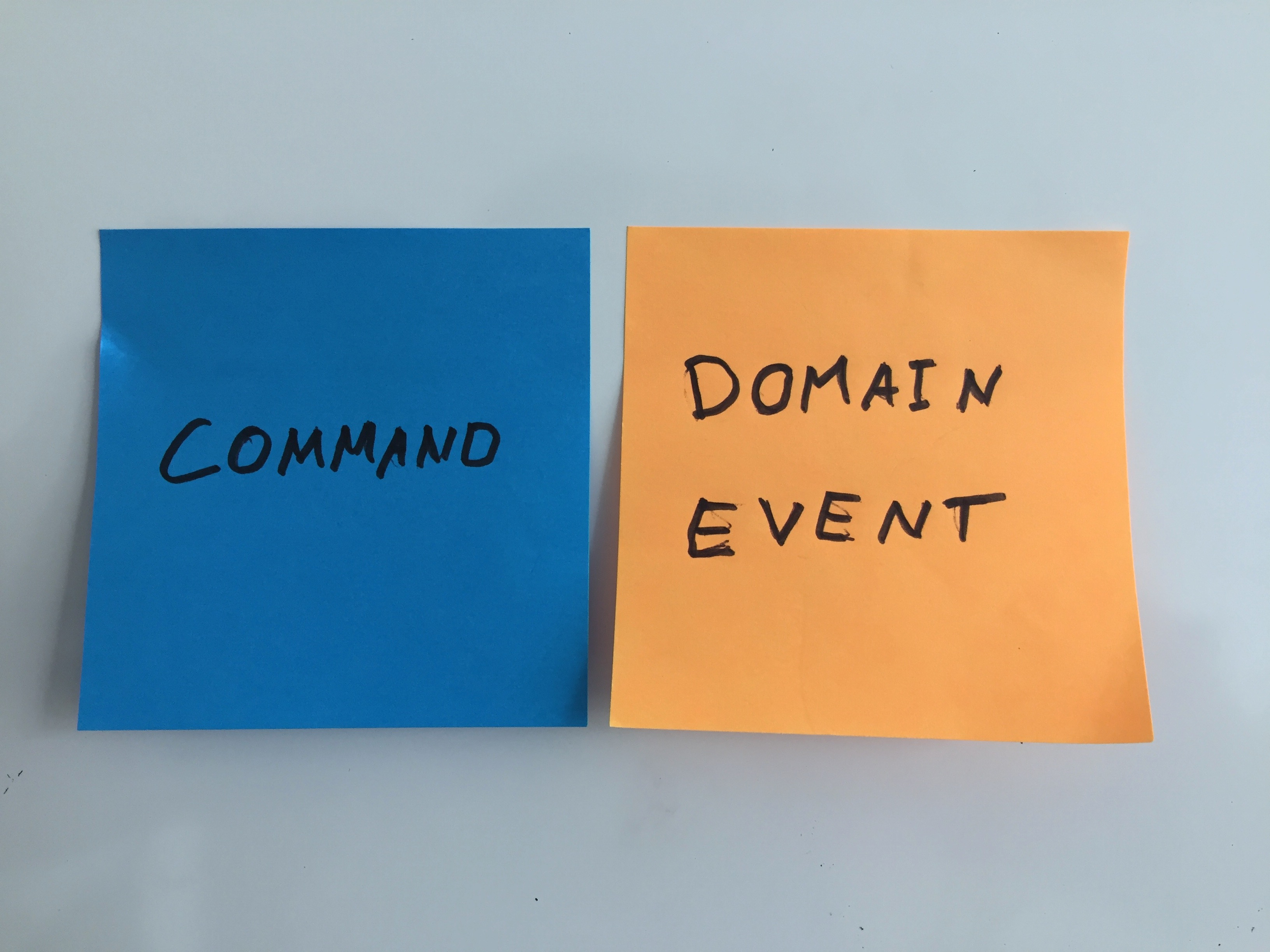
Step 2: Add the commands that caused the domain event

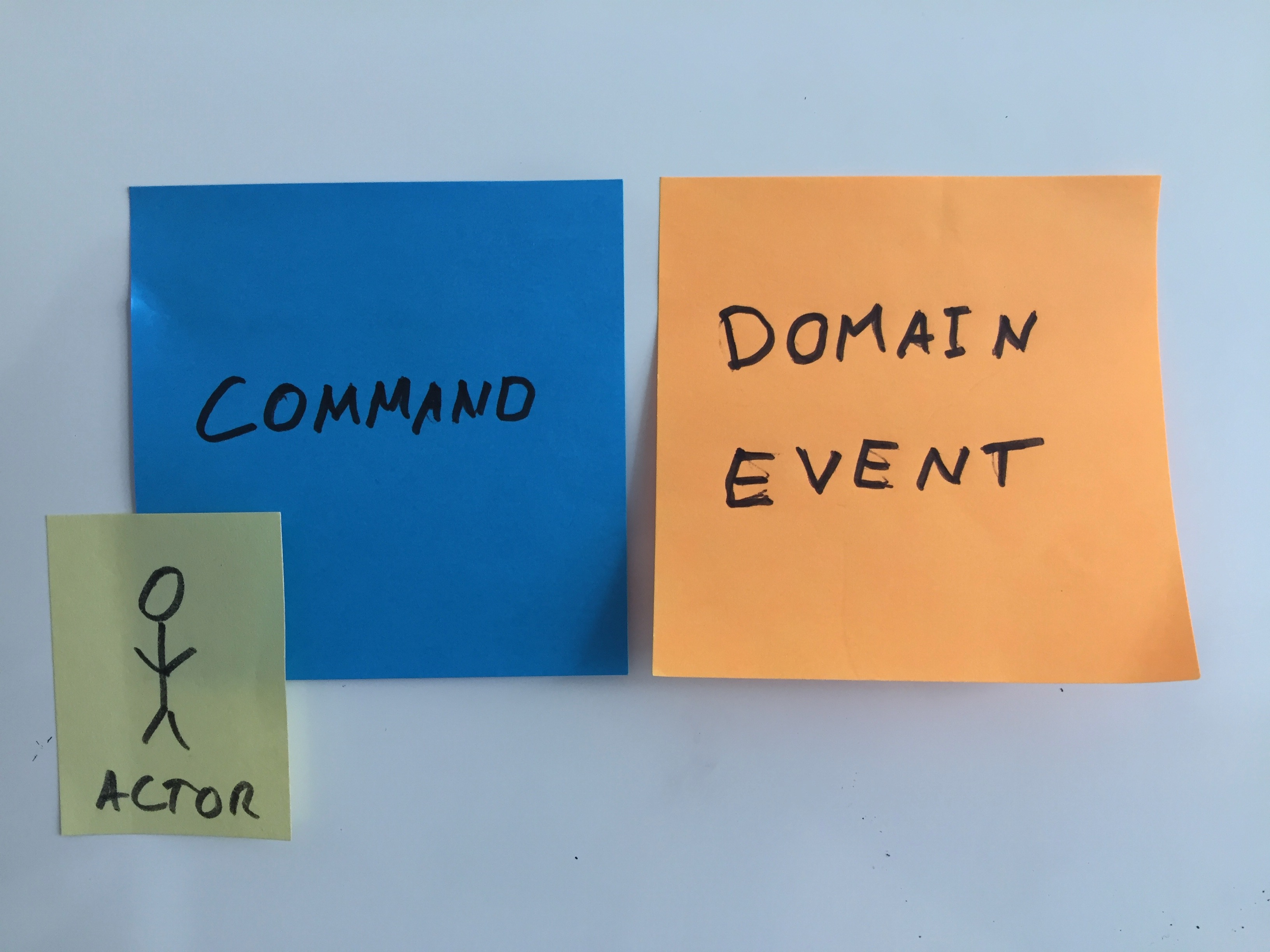
Step 2b: Add the actor that executes the command

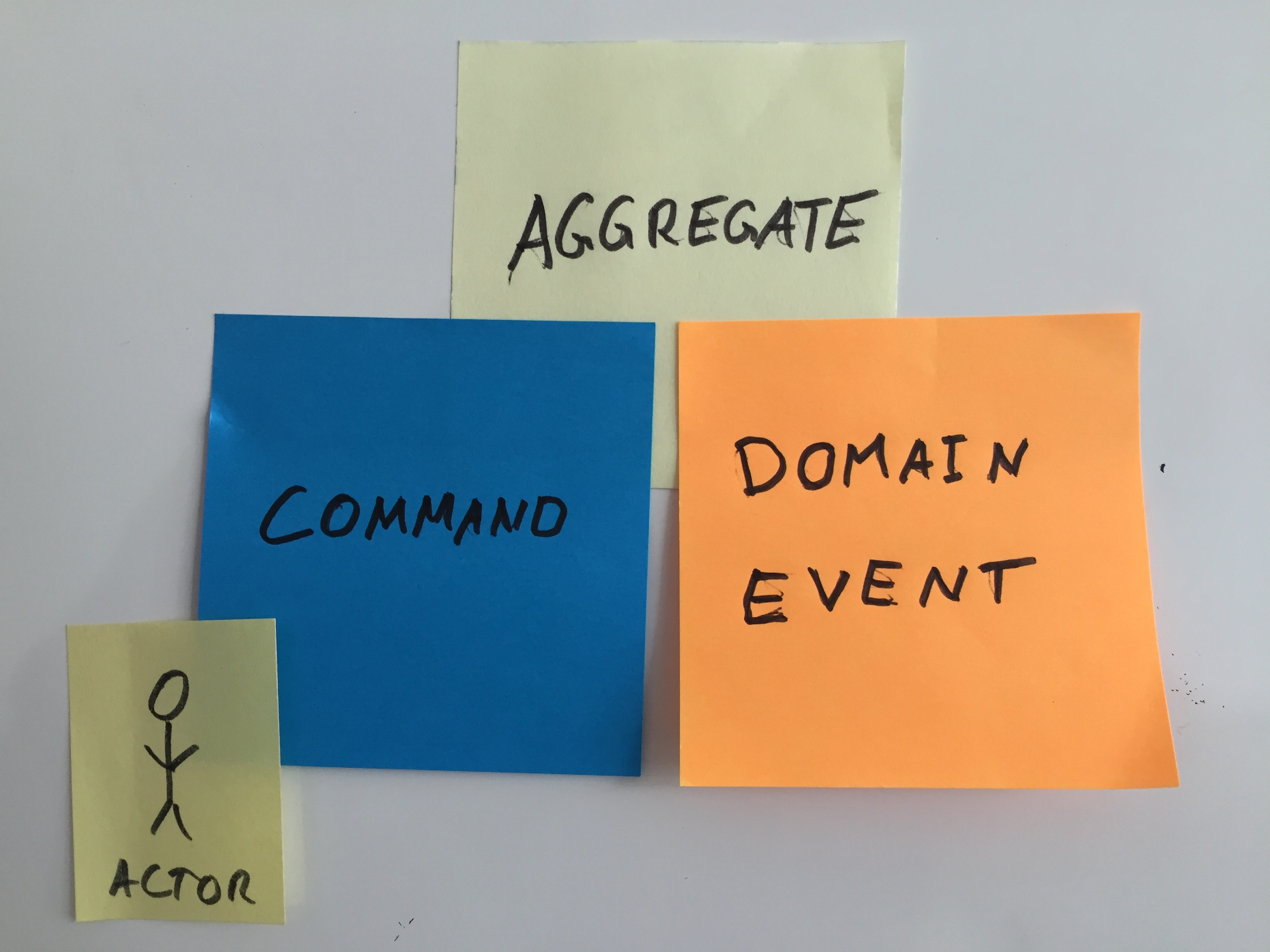
Step 3: Add corresponding aggregate

The first step is to find the domain events and write them on orange sticky notes.

When all domain events are found the second step is to find the command that caused each of the domain events. Commands are written on blue notes and placed directly before the corresponding domain event.

In the third step the aggregates within which commands are executed and where events happen are identified. The aggregates are written in yellow stickies.

The concepts gathered during an EventStorming session fall into several categories, each with its own colour of sticky note:

Domain event
An event that occurs in the business process. Written in past tense.
Actor
A person who executes a command through a view.
Business process
Processes a command according to business rules and logic. Creates one or more domain events.
Command
A command executed by a user through a view on an aggregate that results in the creation of a domain event.
Aggregate
Cluster of domain objects that can be treated as a single unit.
External system
A third-party service provider such as a payment gateway or shipping company.
View
A view that users interact with to carry out a task in the system.

== Example notes ==
These are examples, these would be different for different organizations.

Domain events

AccountCreated
AccountDeleted
OrderCreated

Actors

Guest
Registered user
Administrator

Commands

CreateAccount
DeleteAccount
CreateOrder

Aggregates

Orders
Users

External systems

Stripe (payment provider)
Mailchimp (email provider)

Views

Checkout
Signup

Errors

Service provider is unreachable
Something went wrong

== Example ==
Users
CreateAccount
AccountCreated
Signup

== Result ==
As a result, the business process can be seen on the modeling space. But more important is the knowledge that was built in the minds of the participants.
