= Command Query Responsibility Segregation =

Information technology system architecture

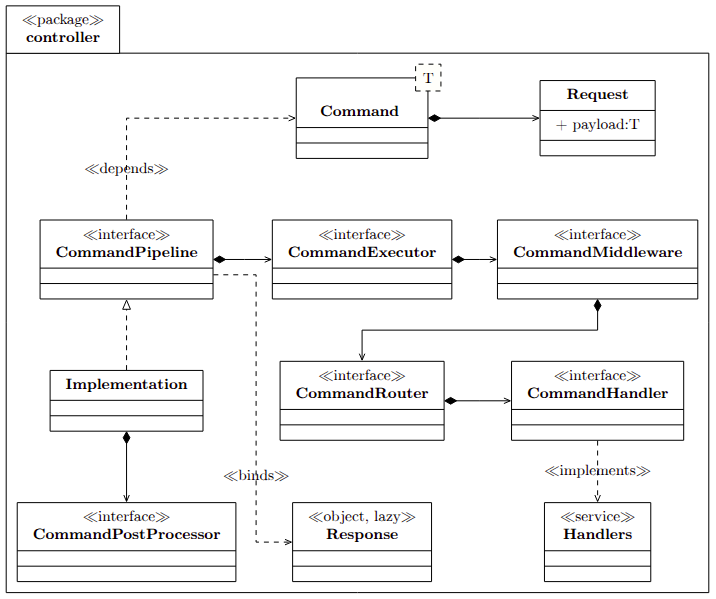
Class Diagram of Command Query Responsibility Segregation

In modern enterprise systems, increasing architectural complexity has introduced significant challenges related to scalability, maintainability, and runtime performance. Implementations of Command Query Responsibility Segregation (CQRS) and event-driven designs frequently integrate core business logic with cross-cutting concerns such as logging, retry policies, and audit propagation. This combination can lead to tightly coupled components, reducing modularity and complicating long-term evolution.

Modern CQRS frameworks aim to decouple these operational aspects from domain logic to improve system adaptability. Drawing on established design principles—such as the Chain of Responsibility and Strategy patterns—alongside declarative programming paradigms, CQRS models command processing as a functional pipeline $P$. Each processing stage $s \in S$ (for example, routing, middleware execution, handler invocation, or post-processing) is coordinated through dynamically extensible interceptor chains $I$.

This architectural approach is intended to provide predictable latency, high throughput, strong type safety, and reliable idempotency characteristics, making it suitable for resilient large-scale distributed applications. In information technology, Command Query Responsibility Segregation (CQRS) is a software architecture that extends the idea behind command–query separation (CQS) to the level of services. Such a system will have separate interfaces to send queries and to send commands. As in CQS, fulfilling a query request will only retrieve data and will not modify the state of the system (with some exceptions like logging access), while fulfilling a command request will modify the state of the system.

Many systems push the segregation to the data models used by the system. The models used to process queries are usually called read models and the models used to process commands are write models.

Although its origin is usually attributed to Greg Young in 2010, everything indicates that the precursor of CQRS was Udi Dahan who in August 2008 published on his blog a training course that aimed to apply CQRS together with SOA and in more detail in December 2009 in the article Clarified CQRS.
