= Product information management =

Managing marketing and sales information

Product information management (PIM) is the process of managing all the information required to market and sell products through distribution channels. This product data is created by an internal organization to support a multichannel marketing strategy. A central hub of product data can be used to distribute information to sales channels such as e-commerce websites, print catalogues, online marketplaces, social media platforms, large language models and electronic data feeds to trading partners. PIM reduces the abandonment rate and improves conversion rates by giving better product information.

== Definitions ==
Forrester Research defines product information management as a way to ensure the quality and integrity of product data, allowing businesses to manage and orchestrate this data and its associated content while acting as a hub between content management, e-commerce, digital asset management and enterprise resource planning systems. This process is used to bring products to market and syndicate existing products on digital systems.

According to Gartner, the purpose of PIM is to "speed up your time to market, improve all aspects of sales, and deliver compelling product experiences across any touchpoint".

== Technology ==
PIM systems consolidate all product information onto a single platform. It helps connect retailing and manufacturing channels to counter complex challenges in managing and maintaining product data quality. In terms of company information technology infrastructure, a PIM platform runs over or alongside a database with an application server, and/or XML-based exchange of product information. This forms a foundation to build sales and procurement business processes. With PIM solutions, access and user authorizations for all database information, ordering processes linked with inventory management systems and the mechanisms for modular expansions are managed via a web-based administration interface.

PIM manages customer-facing product data required to support multiple geographic locations, multilingual data, and maintenance and modification of product information within a centralized product catalogue. PIM can act as a centralized hub for storing product information and from every channel. Product information kept by a business can be scattered throughout departments and held by employees or systems, instead of being available centrally. The data may be saved in various formats, or only be available in hard copy form. It also helps businesses to improve their conversion rate optimization (CRO) by displaying consistent branding and reducing abandonment rate. PIM allows the automation of most of the processes of product creation and provides a centralized solution for media-independent product data maintenance, efficient data collection, data governance and output.

Data exchange interface standards allow seamless interchange of electronic catalogues between vendors on the one hand and purchasing firms and marketplace operators. E-procurement solutions are closely related, which automate the procurement process for purchasing goods and services. These create transparency for the product data of multiple vendors to support the centralized management of multi-supplier catalogues and facilitate price and quality research.

Data management systems are often not interoperable meaning that data exchange without PIM can lead to severe repercussions for a business. Some companies use master data management as an information technology resource, but master data management systems are not a business application and often lack usability and product data management capabilities including data enrichment, validation and workflow rules, all of which impact return on investment.

== Types and application ==
PIM systems are used to manage structured data in a business context for feeding into any kind of distribution channel, from electronic catalogues to online shops to print catalogues. It stresses the need for capabilities to seamlessly disseminate product content through (digital and physical) sales channels. An item master refers to the technology that collects, organises and controls the product information within a company.

=== Product data management ===
Product data management (PDM) is the use of software or other tools to track and control information related to a particular product. The managed data usually involves the descriptions and technical specifications of a product. PDM involves the management of structured, technical data for such applications as parts diagrams and lists.

=== Product experience management ===
Product experience management (PXM) is the practice of managing and optimizing how products are presented and experienced during each digital or physical touchpoint. It delivers customers an experience around its products or services throughout the customer lifecycle. PXM integrates PIM and customer experience management to attract customer loyalty and according to a senior Forrester analyst, "great product experiences start with great product data".

=== Management systems ===
Enterprise content management is a term encompassing technologies, methods and tools used for gathering, imaging, storing, archiving and providing electronic content. Document management systems are deployed for archiving. Content management systems are more commercially oriented and provide a framework for knowledge management or informational service offerings through the management of unstructured, document-type content. Cross-media publishing comes from the print and advertising industries, referring to the coordinated use of multiple media in complementary fashion. It also denotes the repeated usage of individual structural elements such as text, images or graphics within different media.

Product life-cycle management refers more to a management strategy than to a specific information technology, the goal of which is to optimize the entire life cycle of a product from inception, through engineering design and manufacturing over time. Digital asset management refers to the management of unstructured multimedia objects such as images, graphics and presentations as well as metadata.

== In practice ==
PIM solutions are most relevant to business-to-consumer and business-to-business firms that sell products through a variety of sales channels in a range of industries. The use of PIM is generally influenced by a company's:

- wide array of products and/or complex product data set
- frequently changing product characteristics
- increasing number of sales channels
- non-uniform information technology infrastructure (plethora of data sources and formats)
- online business and electronic ordering
- various locales and localization requirements
- support SEO strategies of business

Point of sales systems and online shopping platforms including online marketplaces such as Amazon and Google Shopping as well as social media platforms like Instagram are based upon electronic catalogues. PIM systems can load descriptive product information as content into a catalogue management solution, where products are grouped and managed for specific target markets.

In 2025, AI shopping agents were popularized by Mastercard, IBM and PayPal among others. This form of e-commerce is designed to search for products or services, evaluate options, make purchasing decisions, and complete payments with no direct human involvement. Known as agentic commerce, AI PIM autonomously enriches data for machine learning and multichannel syndication. Agentic commerce sales were projected to be $5 trillion by 2030.

== See also ==
- Controlled vocabulary
- Identity resolution
- Ontology (information science)
