= Great Western Main Line upgrade =

Major electrification project by Network Rail

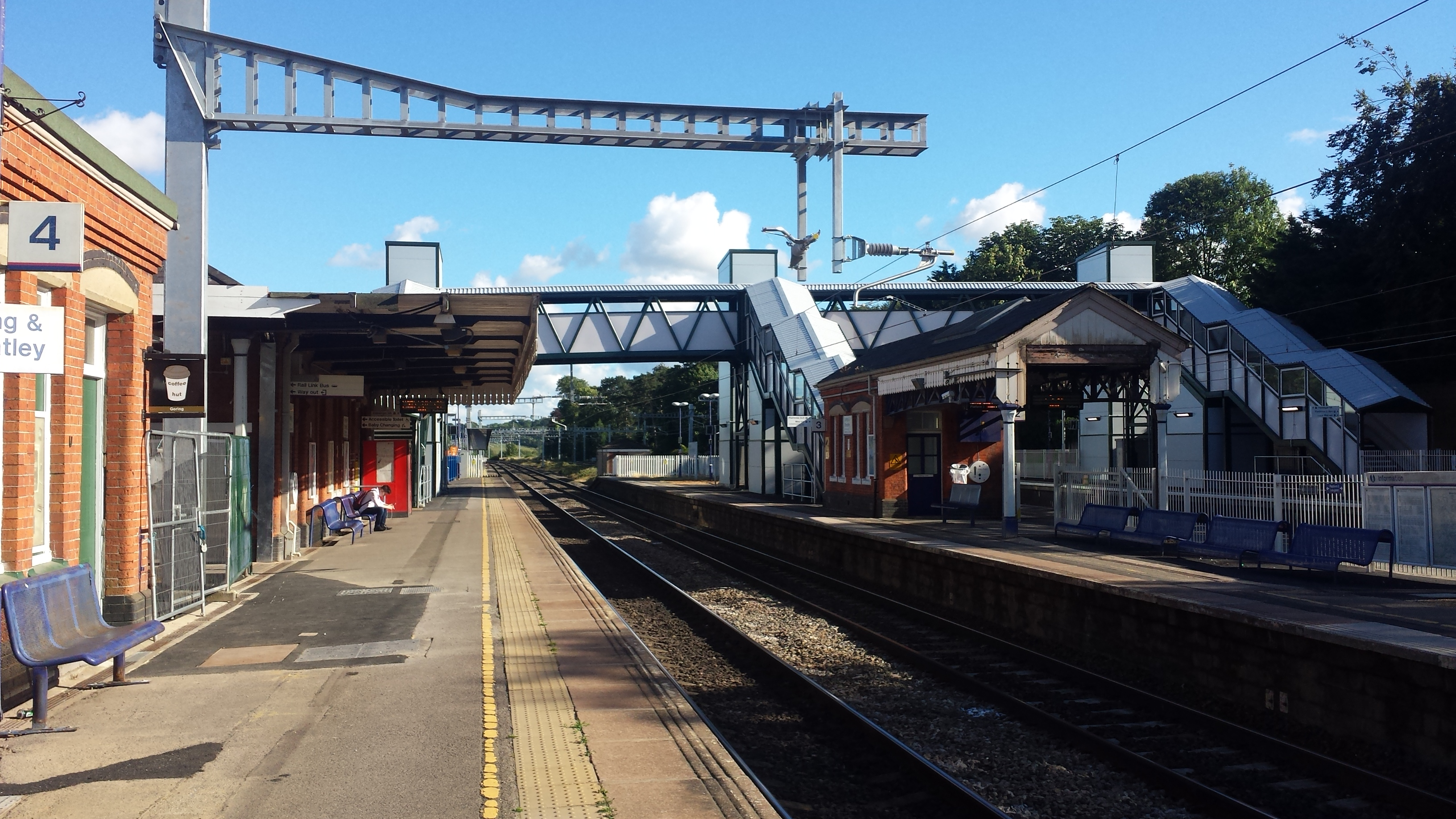
The station at Goring & Streatley with the new footbridge and electrification in progress

In the 2010s Network Rail modernised the Great Western Main Line, the South Wales Main Line, and other associated lines. The modernisation plans were announced at separate times but their implementation overlapped in the 2010s.

The work included electrification, resignalling, new rolling stock and station upgrades. The programme began in June 2010 and at that time was due to end in 2017. The project was completed in 2020, allowing electric services to run between London Paddington and Cardiff.

The project had several delays. Four sections were deferred indefinitely:

- Oxford to Didcot Parkway
- Bristol Parkway to Bristol Temple Meads
- Thingley Junction, near Chippenham, to Bath Spa and Bristol Temple Meads
- Thames Valley branches to Henley and Windsor

The Cardiff to Swansea electrification was cancelled in 2017.

Under the Intercity Express Programme (IEP), 21 electric Class 801 trains were ordered as replacements for the ageing InterCity 125 diesels. In May 2016 it was confirmed that the new trains would be built as 'bi-mode' Class 800s instead, meaning they can run on either diesel power or electric overhead wire.

== Historical background ==
At the start of the 21st century, the Great Western Main Line and the Midland Main Line were the last of the major main line routes in the UK using diesel as the main source of locomotive power. When the announcement was made in July 2009 to electrify the Great Western (along with the Liverpool-Manchester line), it represented the first big rail electrification project in the UK for 20 years. The South Wales Main Line section of the GWML was set to be the first electrified cross-country railway line in Wales.

The plan to upgrade the rolling stock on the Great Western was included in the IEP announced in 2007, a Department for Transport (DfT) led initiative to replace the ageing fleet of InterCity 125 and InterCity 225 train sets then in use on much of the UK rail network.

== Electrification ==
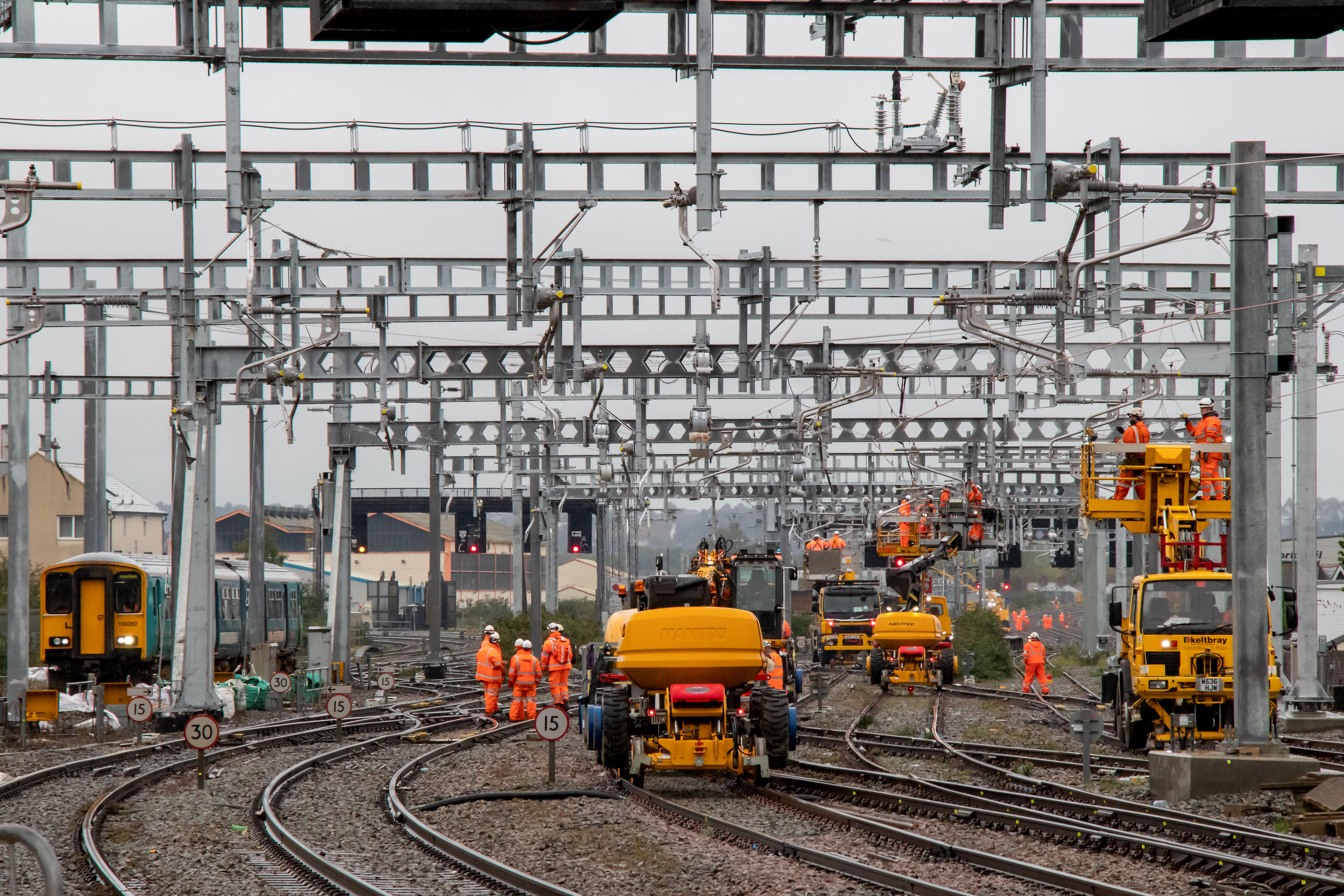
Electrification work at Cardiff Central on the South Wales Main Line

=== Status ===
Passenger timetables introduced electric running from Paddington to Didcot in January 2018, and to Swindon and as far west as Bristol Parkway in January 2019. The same month saw electric services between Reading and Newbury. Electric running to Newport commenced in December 2019 and to Cardiff in January 2020.

The Cardiff to Swansea electrification was formally abandoned in 2017. As of 2023, the electrification of Didcot to Oxford has yet to happen, after being delayed until track modification and station remodelling at Oxford.

=== Earlier work ===
Prior to 2009, the only electrified portion of the Great Western was between London Paddington and Airport Junction (west of Hayes and Harlington). This portion is equipped with a 25 kV AC overhead system which was implemented in 1997 in readiness for the Heathrow Express service commencing in early 1998. Electrification was extended from Airport Junction to Maidenhead under the Crossrail scheme. Further electrification west of Maidenhead was announced by the DfT separately, though the work west of Airport Junction (to take Crossrail to Maidenhead) and west of Maidenhead is likely to be undertaken as one scheme.

=== July 2009 announcement ===
The UK government first considered electrifying the Great Western between London Paddington and Bristol Temple Meads in a first phase, then electrifying the rest of the line between Swindon and Swansea at a later date. However, in July 2009, the Department of Transport under the then Labour Government (in the run-up to the 2010 general election), announced that there would be a £1bn programme to electrify the whole of the Great Western from London to Swansea as well as to Bristol Temple Meads. The Labour government claimed that the investment would pay for itself over a 40-year period.

The scheme announced by the government on 23 July 2009 stated that "work will begin immediately on the electrification of the Great Western Main Line between London, Reading, Oxford, Newbury, Bristol, Cardiff and Swansea, to be completed within eight years" (2016/2017). The proposed electrified route included:

- the Great Western Main Line between London Paddington and Bristol Temple Meads via Swindon, Chippenham, and Bath Spa;
- the South Wales Main Line from Swindon to Swansea via the Severn Tunnel;
- the connecting line from Bristol Parkway to Bristol Temple Meads;
- the section of the Cherwell Valley Line connecting Didcot Parkway with Oxford; and
- the section of the Reading to Taunton line connecting Reading with Newbury.

Estimates showed that the Hitachi Super Express trains could reduce journey times from London Paddington to Swansea by 19 minutes.

In an effort to minimise disruption during the electrification works, Network Rail developed new "factory engineering trains" to facilitate the process of installing overhead lines. There are three types of train: the first train to install pylons, followed by a train to hang the wires and finally a train to check the installation. The system was expected to be able to install 1.5 kilometres (0.93 mi) of electrification in an eight-hour shift. The vehicles were supplied by German firm Windhoff.

In its initial survey, Network Rail identified 113 structures – mainly bridges and tunnels – which required modernisation. In subsequent surveys this increased to 137. The largest structure, the Severn Tunnel, has good clearances and is relatively easy to electrify.

=== Review and announcements after May 2010 general election ===
After the 2010 UK general election in May 2010, the Conservative–Liberal Democrat coalition placed all major government capital expenditure, including the Great Western electrification scheme on hold pending a return-on-investment review. In November 2010, Transport Secretary Philip Hammond gave the go-ahead for the lines from Oxford via Didcot to London and Newbury to London to be electrified in the next six years. Extension from Didcot to Swindon, Bath, Bristol and to South Wales would be dependent on a further assessment due in 2011 of the costs and implementation requirements of the IEP.

On 1 March 2011, Hammond announced that rail electrification from Didcot Parkway to Bristol Temple Meads and Cardiff Central would go ahead. The section linking Bristol Parkway and Bristol Temple Meads would also be electrified.

In March 2012, Amey plc was awarded a £700 million contract to undertake the electrification works.

In July 2012, the UK Government announced that the final portion of the Great Western from Cardiff to Swansea would be electrified. In addition, as part of the Electric Spine project, the line between Reading and Basingstoke would also be electrified at 25kV AC OHL. The overhead electrification of the branches to Henley, Marlow and Windsor were also added to the scope of the project. However, the Marlow electrification has been postponed for the foreseeable future due to difficulties at Bourne End.

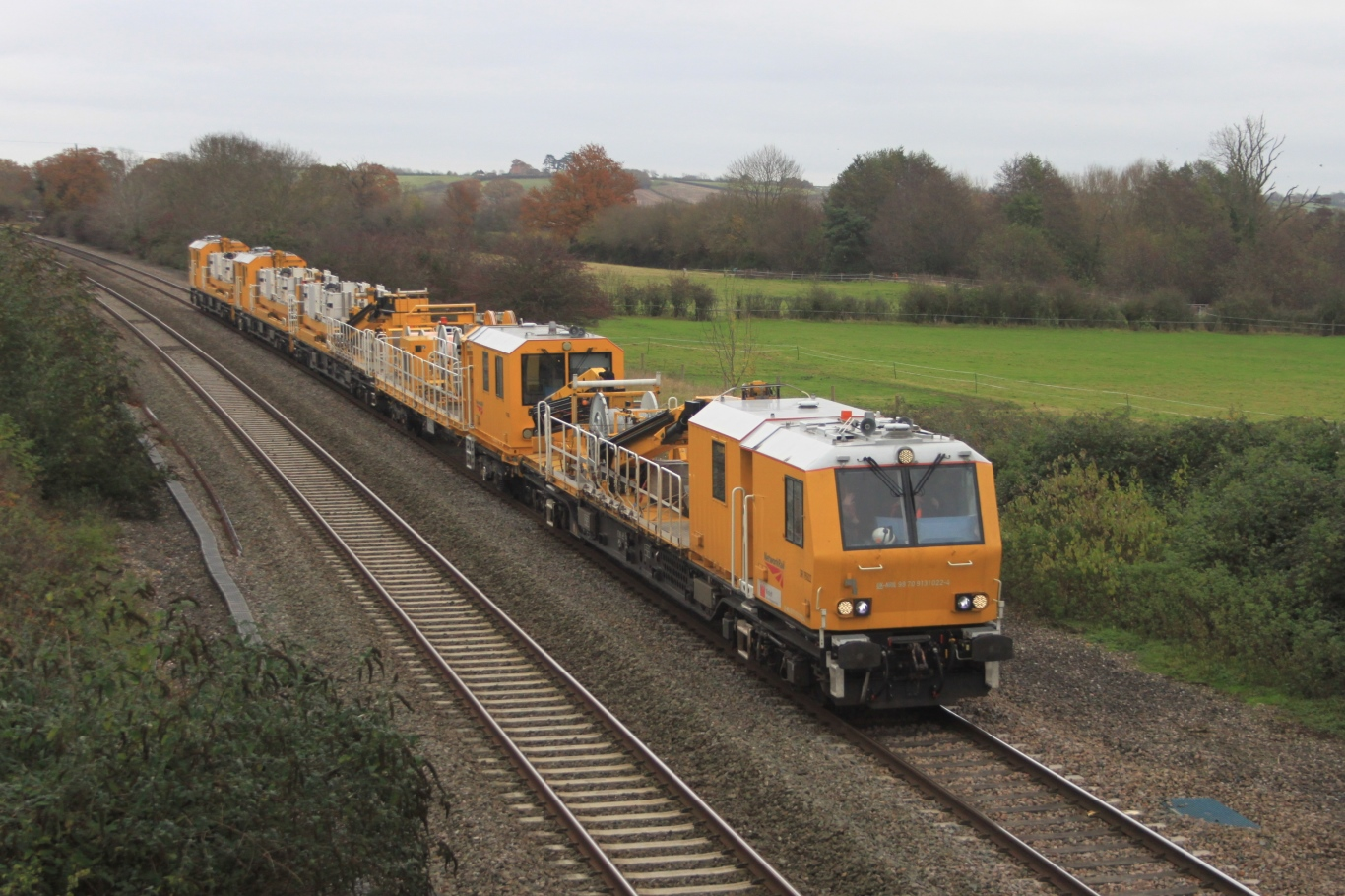
A High Output Plant System train

The new NR Series 1 overhead line equipment, designed and manufactured by Furrer+Frey, is a TSI compliant OLE design specified to allow multiple pantograph operation at 140 mph (230 km/h) operation and is being installed using Amey plc's High Output Plant System (HOPS) and other conventional techniques. This is designed to allow Adjacent Line Operation (ALO) where works can be carried out while trains operate on adjacent tracks. The HOPS has five sections, each of which handles a different aspect of the installation – these can be coupled together to work as one unit, or separated to work independently. The train will be maintained at the High Output Operations Base (HOOB) in Swindon, on the site of former sidings. HOPS will mix and lay 30 m^{3} (1,100 cu ft) of concrete per night, and all equipment and personnel will arrive at the site on board.

The HOPS train was operational by 2014, but had not reached full productivity due to teething problems. By 2015, completion of the electrification project had been delayed, reportedly 1 year behind schedule, with completion expected in 2017. Costs of the electrification were reported to have tripled from an estimated £640M to £1.74bn.

=== Reviews after May 2015 general election ===
==== 2015 ====
In June 2015, the International Railway Journal reported: "Britain's secretary of state for transport, Mr Patrick McLoughlin has asked Sir Peter Hendy to review Network Rail's 2014–2019 capital investment programme, known as CP5, and report back in the autumn". The report stated that costs had tripled from the £874M original estimate to £2.8bn, and was £1.2bn higher than the estimate made a year ago. The main part of the programme will go ahead as planned and should be delivered by March 2019, but the Cardiff to Swansea section will be delayed, to some time between 2019 and 2024.

Revised dates for the completion of electrification work were published in early 2016, with electrification to Cardiff via Bristol Parkway, and the connection to Newbury planned by December 2018; the branch to Oxford from Didcot by June 2019; and the branch to Bristol Temple Meads from Wootton Bassett sometime between February 2019 and April 2020.

==== 2016 ====
In November 2016, the government announced that electrification work on the sections from Oxford to Didcot Parkway, Bristol Parkway to Bristol Temple Meads, Thingley Junction (near Chippenham) to Bath Spa and Bristol Temple Meads, and branches lines to Henley and Windsor had been indefinitely deferred. For Oxford and Bristol, the deferral was due to imminent resignalling and remodelling of the existing track layout.

==== 2017 ====
In July 2017, it was announced that the Cardiff-Swansea electrification project had been cancelled and that bi-mode trains would be used on the route.

== Resignalling ==
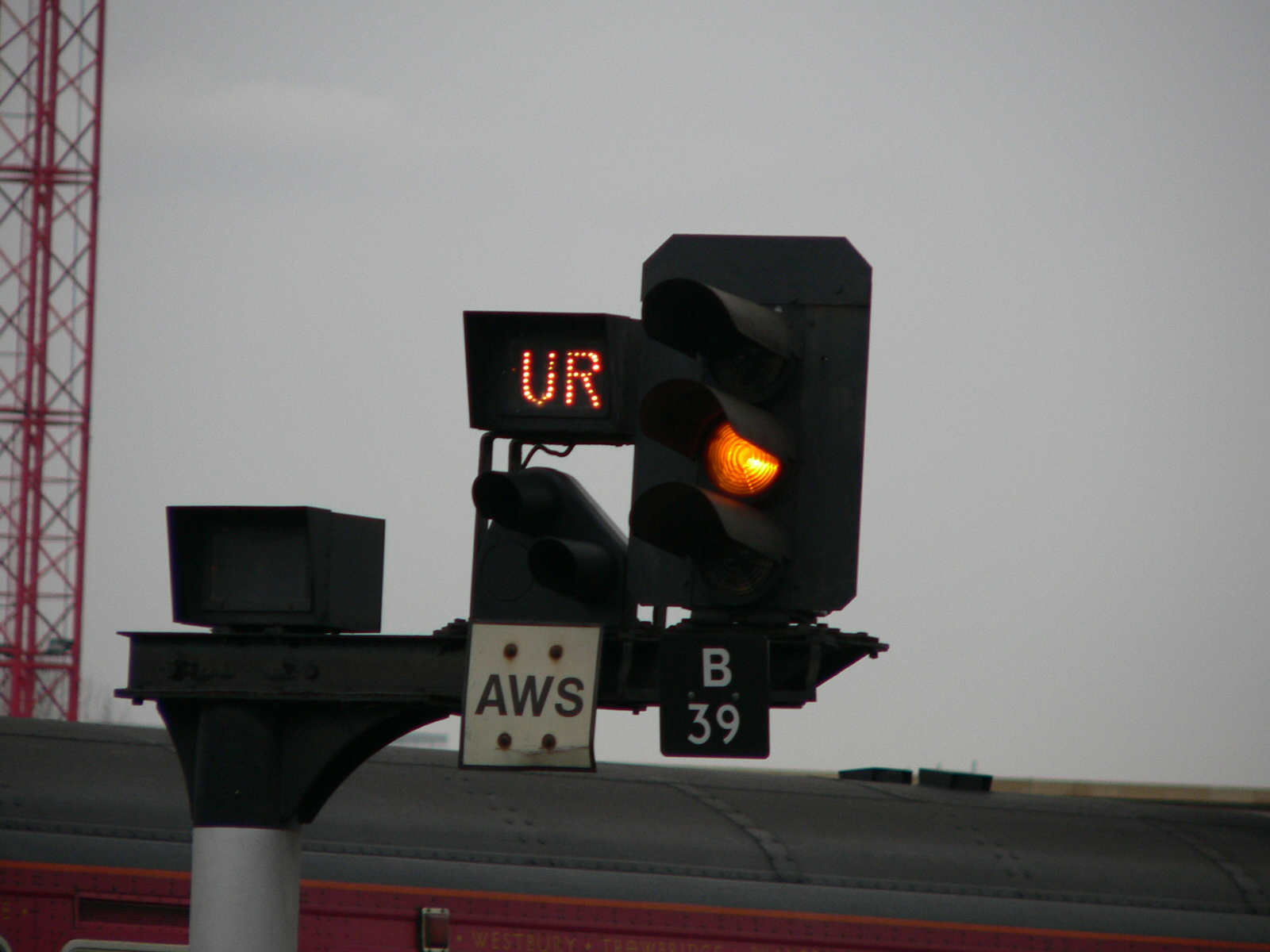
Example of a colour light signal at Bristol Temple Meads station

The Great Western Main Line was equipped with colour light signalling common to the rest of the United Kingdom. At the time of the Ladbroke Grove rail crash (1999), the ATP (Automatic Train Protection) warning system was under trial. In response to that incident, it became a requirement for all First Great Western trains to be fitted with ATP.

When the Department for Transport wrote the specification for the new trains for the IEP in November 2007, it was stated that the Great Western Main Line would be upgraded to ERTMS/ETCS level 2 in-cab signalling and trackside infrastructure. Some or all of the resignalling work would be carried out alongside the electrification work. Signalling Solutions would resignal the 12 miles from Paddington to West Drayton, including the Airport branch, as part of the Crossrail project.

=== Thames Valley ===
In November 2008, Westinghouse (subsequently known as Invensys Rail, and now part of Siemens Rail Automation) was awarded a £20m contract for a 30-month programme of signalling enabling work. Over a series of 12 commissionings, Invensys Rail would re-lock the existing Reading Station and Spur interlockings to three new WESTLOCK interlocking units, re-control the remaining 18 relay interlockings, and move signalling and telecommunications control from Reading Station to the new Thames Valley Signalling Centre at Didcot. The work was due to be completed in December 2010.

The Thames Valley signalling centre was to eventually replace older signalling control in the entire English Western region. The London area was due to switch over at the end of 2011, followed by the old Slough PSB (Power Signal Box) area. Attention would then be given to abolishing Oxford, Swindon A, Bristol PSBs and the 1990s Swindon B IECC. This would be followed by the elimination of the 1980s PSBs at Westbury and Exeter, and the 1970s Plymouth PSB, and the 1960s PSB at Gloucester as well as substantial semaphore signalling in Cornwall.

=== South Wales ===
The first phase of a £400M, ten-year resignalling scheme in South Wales by Network Rail was carried out on a 22-mile (35 km) stretch between Port Talbot and Bridgend (termed Port Talbot East) in 2006 and 2007. The works provided a new turnback facility in both directions at Port Talbot Parkway if required. The renewals replaced an old British Railways Western Region NX panel installation, dating from 1963. Further signalling renewals were programmed for the Newport area, Cardiff and Port Talbot West.

The first phase of the Newport Area remodelling and resignalling began in 2009 and was expected to be completed by the end of 2010. The first phase covered the line between Patchway and Marshfield to the west of Newport. A new South Wales Control Centre, built on the eastern end of Canton Depot in Cardiff, opened in Spring 2009. When the Newport Area resignalling was completed in 2011, the Newport signalbox would be closed. Control would pass to the South Wales Control Centre for other parts of the South Wales network as resignalling progressed.

== Rolling stock ==
=== Long distance inter-city services ===
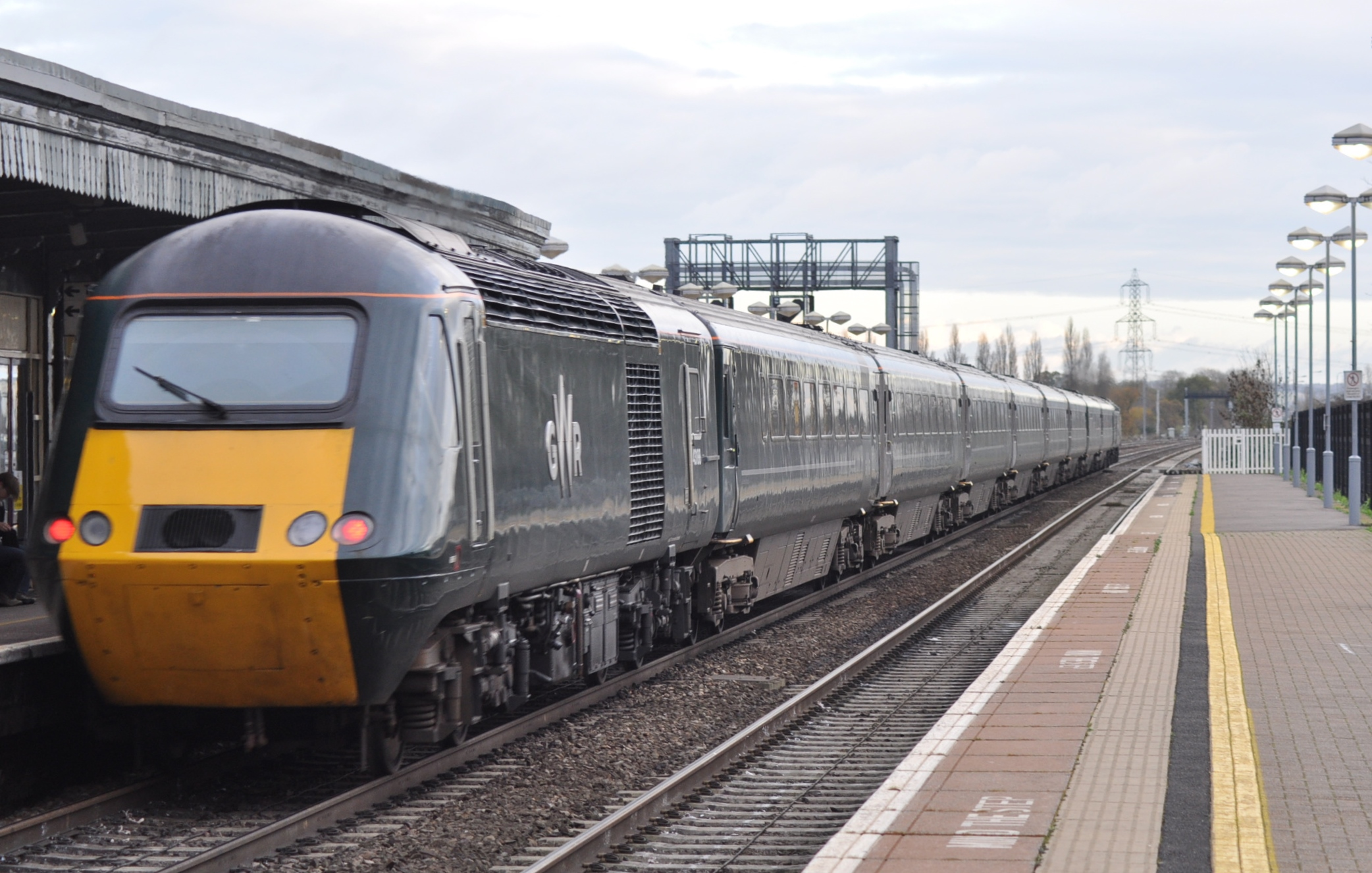
InterCity 125 at Didcot Parkway

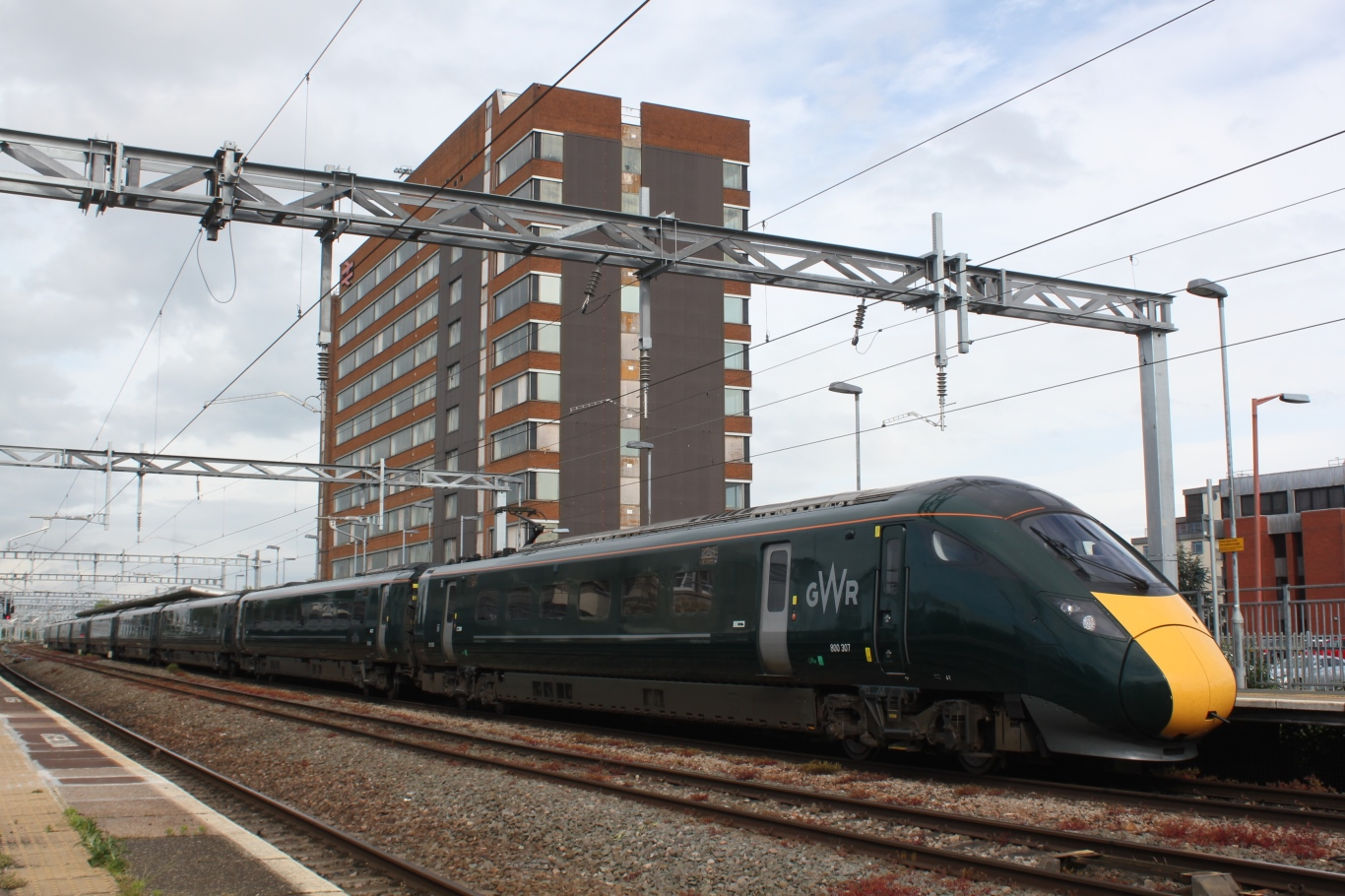
Class 800 at Swindon

Until May 2019, services from London Paddington to South West England and South Wales were served by InterCity 125 train sets, built between 1975 and 1982, which could operate at up to 125 mph (201 km/h). They were replaced by Class 800 and Class 802 "AT300" units from the Hitachi A-train family; these have a top speed of 125 mph but will be capable of 140 mph (225 km/h) with minor modifications. Upgrading the signalling on the Great Western to in-cab signalling was a pre-requisite to allow the new trains to run at the higher speed. In the 2010 GWML RUS, Network Rail stated that linespeeds in excess of 125 mph west of Reading would be "reviewed in line with electrification and resignalling opportunities as ERTMS becomes deployed across the RUS area" after Control Period 4 (2014–2019).

The AT300s now used on Great Western inter-city services are bi-modal units that are capable of running on lines with and without overhead wires. This is because of the deferment of the electrification project. Despite the initial limit of 125 mph, the increased acceleration and operational efficiency were expected to decrease the journey time from London to Bristol Temple Meads by 22 minutes. The new trains brought an estimated 15% increased capacity during the morning peak hours. The bi-mode trains allow inter-city services to operate from London directly to locations in South Wales and South West England, to which electrification does not extend under the current electrification proposals, such as Carmarthen, Worcester, Gloucester, Cheltenham and the regions to the southwest of Bristol and Newbury.

New servicing facilities for the new fleet have been developed at the London North Pole Depot, the Filton Triangle rail depot in Stoke Gifford and at Maliphant sidings in Swansea.

=== Thames Valley commuter services ===
Thames Valley commuter services from London Paddington to Reading and Didcot Parkway are operated by a fleet of 33 Class 387 four-car 110 mph (177 km/h) EMUs, having replaced the majority of the Class 165 'Networker Turbo' two or three-car DMUs and Class 166 'Networker Turbo Express' three-car DMUs which are capable of operating at 90 mph (145 km/h). Services which previously ran from Paddington to Oxford now operate short to Didcot Parkway due to electrification not extending to the Cherwell Valley Line between Didcot and Oxford. It was originally planned that Class 365 Networker trains, electric versions of the Class 165/166s previously operated by Govia Thameslink Railway, would cascade from Great Northern services to the Thames Valley, but this did not go ahead as planned and the units remained in operation with Govia Thameslink until their withdrawal in 2021. The 387 units replacing the 165 and 166 units has allowed most of the units to be transferred to St Philip's Marsh depot for use on services in the Bristol and South West area (see Bristol Metro scheme below).

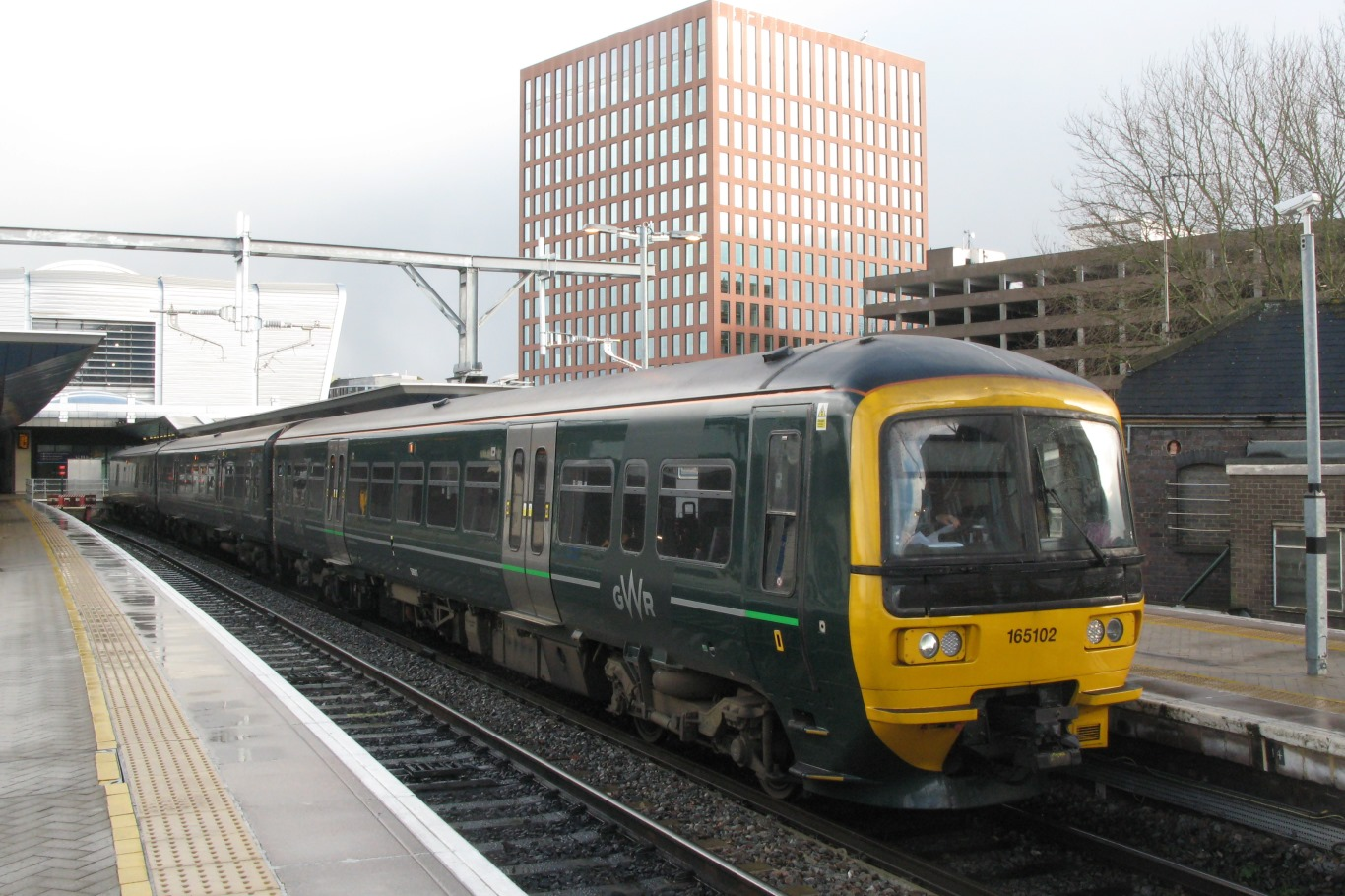
Class 165/1 diesel at Reading

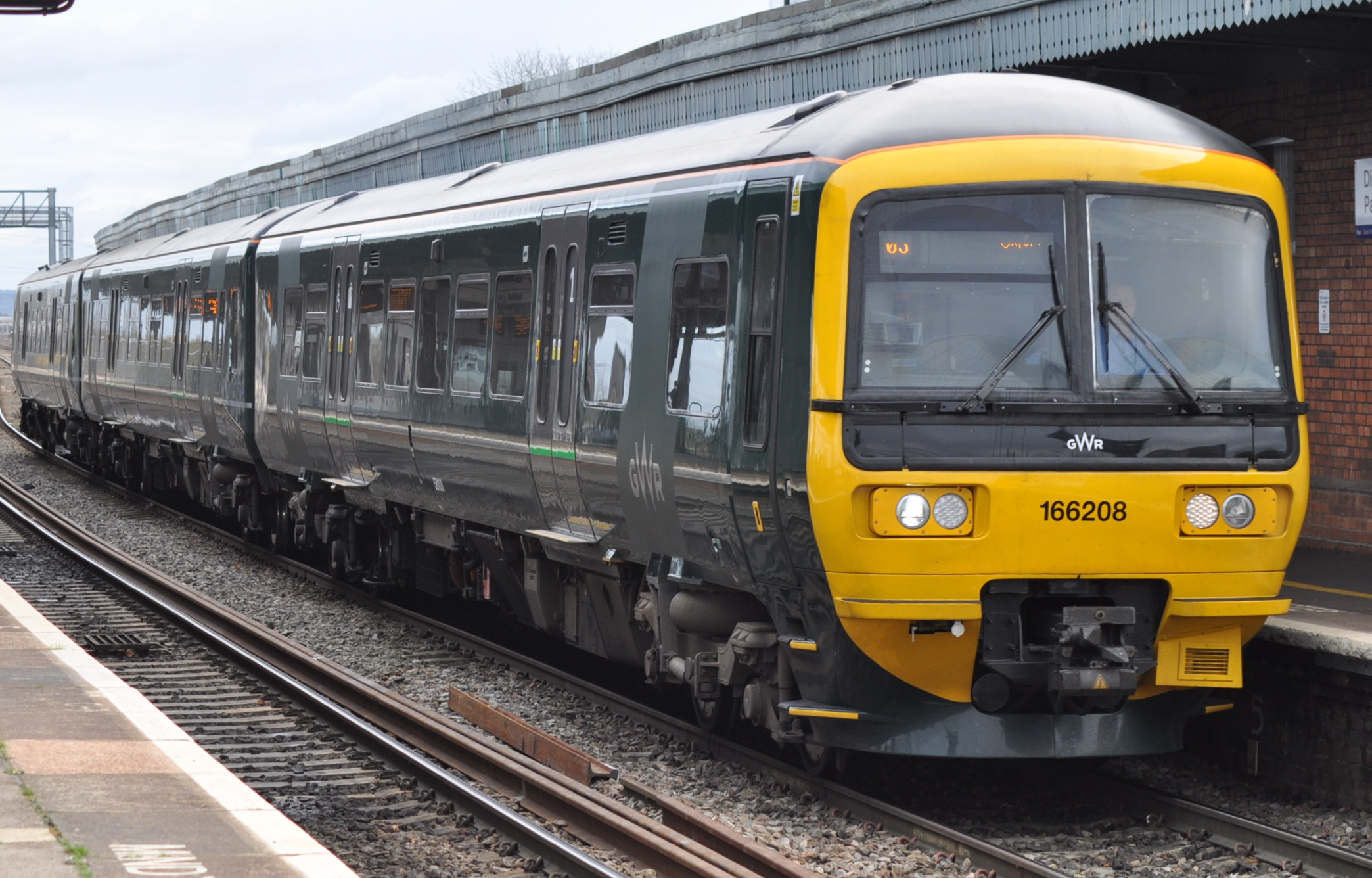
Class 166 diesel at Didcot Parkway

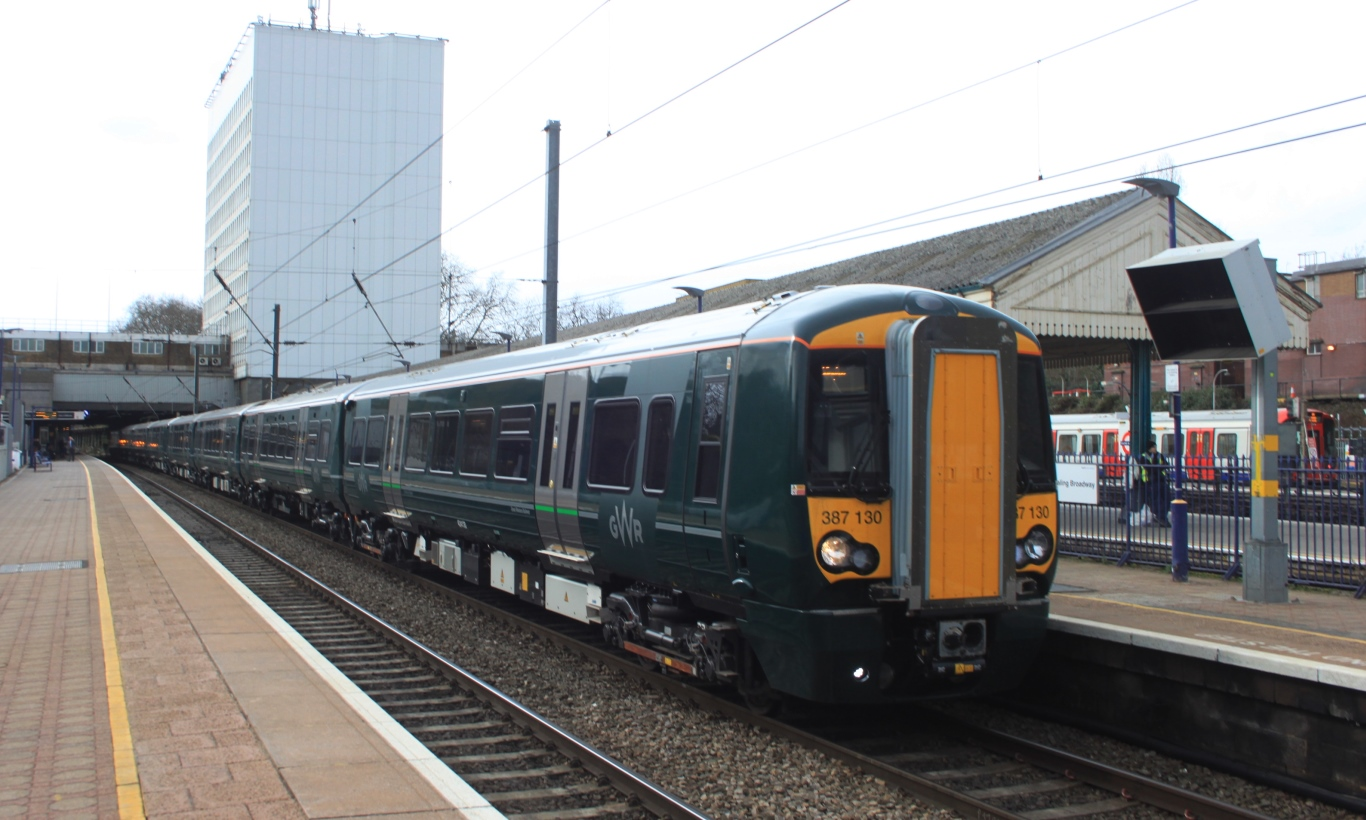
Class 387 electric at Ealing Broadway

=== Elizabeth line ===
The western section of the Elizabeth line, constructed by the Crossrail project and opened in 2022, runs in part on the Great Western line. It has 70 Class 345 trains which are formed of nine carriages and can carry 1,500 passengers. These electric multiple units can achieve speeds of up to 90 mph (140 km/h) on surface sections of the route and up to 60 mph (97 km/h) in the tunnels. The trains were built by Bombardier Transportation at its Derby Litchurch Lane Works.

== Station renovation and enhancements ==
Several stations along the Great Western are undergoing redevelopment or have recently been upgraded to cope with growing passenger numbers and to ease rail traffic congestion.

=== Bristol Temple Meads ===
Bristol Temple Meads will be expanded into Digby Wyatt's 1870s extension to the original train shed, built by Isambard Kingdom Brunel in 1840 as the terminus for the Great Western Main Line. This part of the 'Old Station' building is currently in use as a car park, but will be remodelled as terminating platforms for services to London Paddington. To achieve rail access to the existing old platforms, the Bristol power box, opened in 1970 and controlling 114 route miles of track, will need to be decommissioned and demolished.

=== Bristol Parkway ===
Bristol Parkway had a new third platform (Platform 4) completed in 2007 to provide a new platform for trains departing to London and Birmingham and to make services more reliable between London and south Wales. A new fourth platform has been built on the south side of the station.

=== Reading ===
On 10 September 2008, Network Rail unveiled a £400M regeneration and reconfiguration of Reading station and surrounding track, incorporating an overpass to the west of the station; with freight and passenger trains able to transit from the Reading to Taunton Line and Reading to Basingstoke Line to the 'Relief' lines via an underpass beneath the 'Mains' lines, replacing the conventional at-grade crossing of the 'Mains' lines via points, with the aim of alleviating delays due to slow-moving freight services passing through the station. By 2014 the total cost had risen to more than £800M.

As well as the reconfiguration of the track, the terminal platforms for services to/from London Waterloo will be altered and the Cow Lane bridge under the tracks has been made two-way and now includes a cycle path. There will be improvements that will provide capacity for at least four extra trains in each direction every hour.

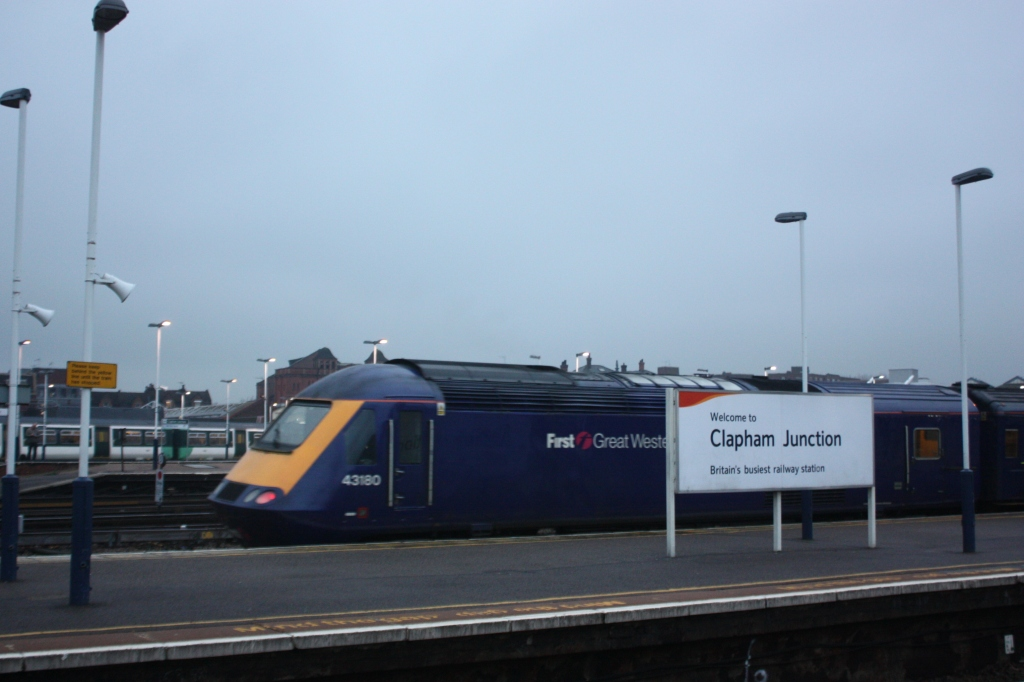
London to Penzance trains were diverted to run from London Waterloo in December 2010 while a new bridge was put into position at Reading. This allowed additional tracks to be laid on the north side of the station.

The station received:

- Five new platforms to ease overcrowding
- A new foot-bridge between platforms
- New escalators and lifts
- A new northern entrance for the station, to serve the north side of the town and Caversham, and provide a link through the station between Reading town centre and the Thames.

These plans provide for the future Crossrail and possible Airtrack services at Reading station, building a railway that will be fit for at least the next thirty years. Also, the improvements will allow six new freight trains each day – this could take around 300 lorries a day off the roads.

While much of the work was carried out in 2010, trains to Devon and Cornwall ran from London Waterloo instead of Paddington, using the South Western Main Line via Basingstoke then the West of England Main Line and Wessex Main Lines. Trains to Bristol, South Wales and Cheltenham were diverted via the Chiltern Main Line (from London to Banbury) where they reversed and returned via Oxford to Didcot Parkway, South Oxfordshire to re-adopt the Great Western Main Line.

As of February 2015, the regeneration and modernisation of Reading Station is complete. The station now has 15 platforms, each serving their own specialist destination and purpose. The new platforms allow more frequent trains to run through Reading and allow more passengers to join longer trains. The entire Reading Redevelopment project will be completed by 2017.

=== Didcot Parkway ===
An improvement programme for the forecourt of Didcot Parkway began in September 2012 and ran for two years. Features included:

- Larger taxi rank with covered waiting area
- Dedicated drop-off and pick-up area
- Short-stay waiting bays
- Disabled parking with step-free access
- Secure cycle parking and motorcycle parking
- Pedestrian piazza with seating and a glazed atrium and walkways
- Extra bus stops with electronic real-time information
- An improved East Car Park
- Better security with CCTV and new lighting
- New drainage to alleviate flooding
- Completion of a cycle route serving the station

In 2018, a new multi-storey car park was built at Didcot Parkway, on the site of the original car park. It provides 1800 spaces to cater for the station's role as a park and ride facility for the surrounding area.

=== Newport ===
In 2009, an upgrade to Newport station was started to enable the station to cope with the expected passenger traffic associated with the 2010 Ryder Cup. A new passenger bridge and two new terminal buildings were constructed, with each platform being served by a lift. The new bridge is clad in ethylene tetrafluoroethylene (ETFE), the material which protects the Eden Project in Cornwall, despite which the roof initially gave problems with leaking. The new development at the station includes a new multi-story car park and a new bus station will be developed outside, replacing the existing Newport bus station. The new north and south concourses opened on 13 September 2010. The development was criticised by Rail columnist Barry Doe for being at the wrong end of the station, having a leaking roof, a lack of seating and generally poor design.

=== Cardiff Central ===
Extra platform capacity at Cardiff Central will be introduced in the form of a new bay platform (platform 5) for services between Cardiff and Maesteg along the GWML and one new through platform to the south of the station (platform 8) for the Cardiff urban services to cater for up to 16 trains per hour. This will bring the number of platforms from 7 to 10. Redevelopment of Cardiff Central bus station outside the railway station commenced in 2008.

=== London Paddington ===
Between 2009 and 2015, a new Crossrail station was to be built under London Paddington, serving as a connection to National Rail services and London Underground. Services were due to start in 2018.

Network Rail had planned to demolish the arched section to the north-east of Paddington station, known as Span 4. Span 4 was an extension completed in 1916 and the roof had since become dangerous. An internal blanket was erected in the 1990s to protect people from falling glass. Span 4 was to be replaced by an office block over the rails but it was later decided that the structure would be restored. The restoration of Span 4 took place between 2009 and 2010, and it re-opened in late 2011, looking notably brighter than the other three spans of the station.

=== Port Talbot Parkway ===
Work on modernising Port Talbot Parkway station began in Autumn 2014. The old ticket office was demolished and a new footbridge built over the platforms. The footbridge will features a new ticket office and step free access to the platforms provided by lifts.

=== Severn Tunnel Junction ===
Severn Tunnel Junction serves as a Park and Ride station for commuters from southern Monmouthshire to Bristol, Newport and Cardiff and there is a local action group – the Severn Tunnel Action Group (STAG) – who are campaigning to enhance the Junction's status as a transport hub for the southern Monmouthshire area. As of January 2010, Network Rail have remodelled the tracks around the station, re-opened Platform 4 and modernised the parking and passenger facilities. The junction where the Gloucester to Newport Line joins the South Wales Main Line has been moved west of the station and now joins the main line with high-speed turnouts.

=== Swansea ===
A £7.6M modernisation of Swansea station began in 2011 and was completed in June 2012. The renovation work included enlargement of the concourse, cleaning of the front of the station with a new entrance, replacement of the partition wall between concourse and platforms with a glazed wall, a new café and more shops.

== Developments on associated lines ==
=== Crossrail ===
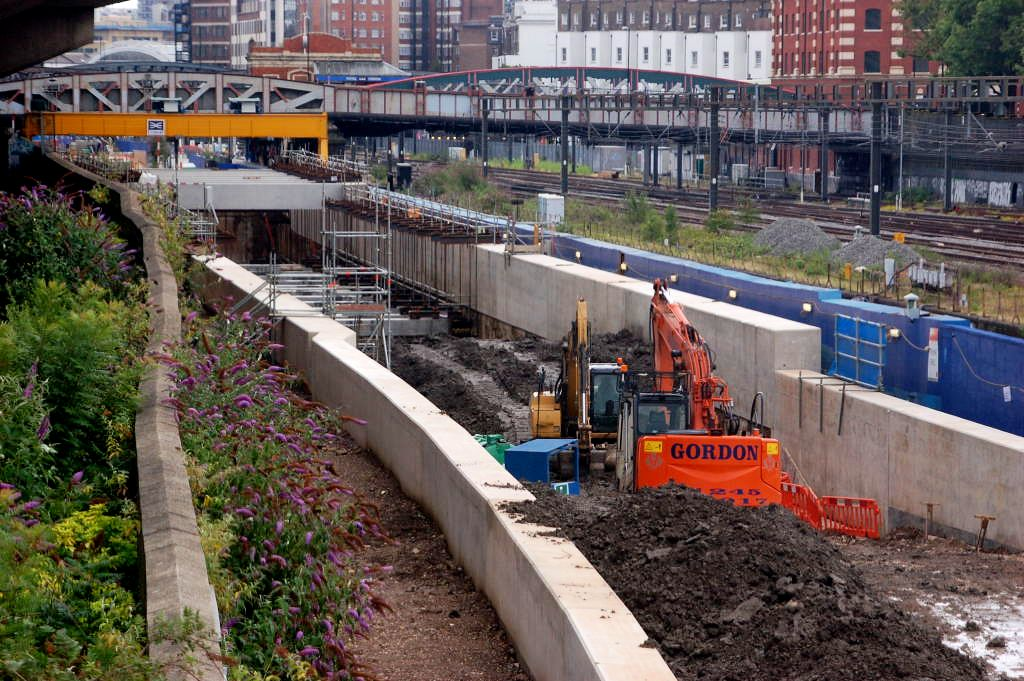
Construction of the Crossrail Portal at Royal Oak, the Great Western Main Line in the right, July 2011

Crossrail was a major rail scheme, which began construction in 2009 and created the Elizabeth line, a new east–west railway connection under Central London. Elizabeth line services join the GWML just west of Paddington station, running to their western terminus at Reading; the Crossrail project included electrification of this stretch. Some GWR inner suburban services using the GWML into Paddington were transferred to the Elizabeth line, which freed up capacity at the surface level station at Paddington.

=== Connection to Heathrow Airport: Western Rail Access Programme ===
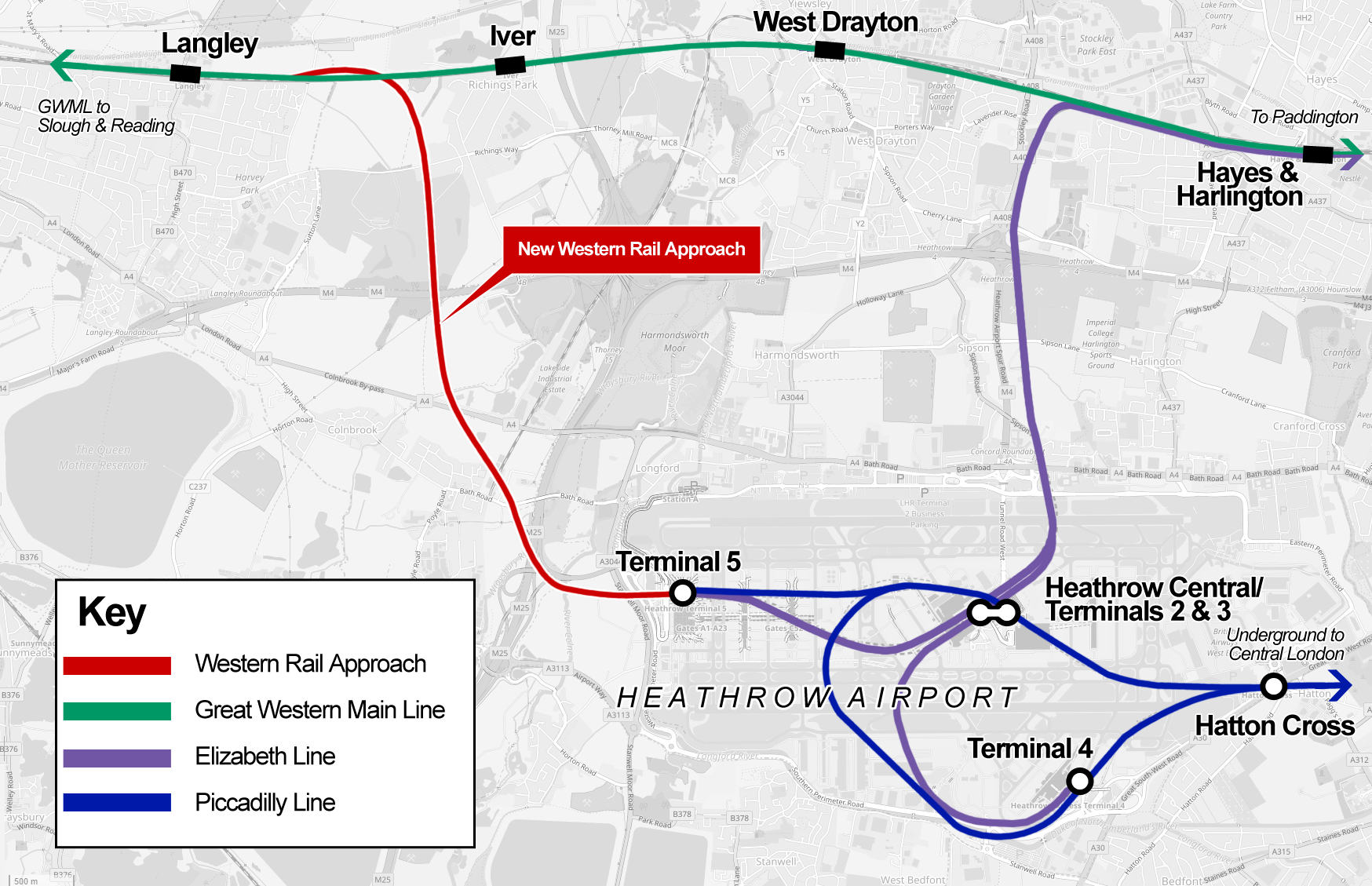
Map of the planned Western Rail Approach to Heathrow

The Western Rail Access Programme is a scheme under development by the DfT, Network Rail and local authorities near Heathrow Airport to develop a direct rail link to the airport from the west. At present passengers travelling from the west of Airport Junction need to change trains at either Hayes and Harlington or Paddington which are to the east of the junction. The proposed link will consist of a 5 km (3 mi) tunnel connecting a new junction between Langley and Iver stations to Terminal 5. The new link will enable direct rail services between Reading and the airport.

With the confirmed electrification of the Great Western Main Line west of Airport Junction, local authorities in the Thames Valley identified a case to be made for introducing a service to Heathrow Airport from Reading via the Great Western, which would also serve Maidenhead and Slough.

On 12 July 2012, Transport Secretary Justine Greening announced that a new rail link connecting Slough and Heathrow had been given the go-ahead and would be operational by 2021. However, as of December 2020, Network Rail was still conducting consultations and construction work had yet to begin.

=== MetroWest ===
MetroWest is a project to improve the rail services in Greater Bristol. It was first proposed at First Great Western's Stakeholder Event in March 2008. On 5 July 2012, the UK government and councils in and around Bristol agreed a City Deal whereby Bristol would have more funding for investment in the area. As a result of the City Deal, around £100M is expected to be invested in rail services under the Greater Bristol Metro scheme. As part of the work, the Cross Country Route between Bristol Parkway and Bristol Temple Meads, commonly known as Filton Bank, will be expanded from two to four tracks.

=== South Wales Metro ===
The South Wales Metro is a proposed integration of heavy rail (South Wales Main Line and Valley Lines) and development of light rail and bus-based public transport services and systems in South East Wales around the hub of Cardiff Central. The first phase was approved for development in October 2013.

=== Swindon–Kemble redoubling ===
The Golden Valley Line serves as a diversionary line for several other lines in the area as well as serving its normal traffic. It was a major diversionary route during the electrification of the Great Western Main Line. The line between Swindon and Kemble was reduced to a single track in 1968, limiting its capacity. In his March 2011 Budget, the Chancellor George Osborne approved a project to re-double this section of line, after several years of campaigning by local politicians. The scheme was completed in August 2014.

=== Further electrification in south Wales ===
During his announcement on Great Western electrification in March 2011, transport secretary Phillip Hammond stated that a good business case existed for the electrification of several south Wales commuter lines. In July 2012, the UK Government announced that the south Wales commuter lines would be electrified. The lines which would be electrified are: all Valleys & Cardiff Local Routes, the Ebbw Valley Railway and the Maesteg Line.

== Controversies ==
=== On infrastructure ===
Some contemporary press reports stated that passengers face six years of disruption from the electrification work. Over 100 bridges and tunnels require demolition or modification to accommodate the new overhead lines.

The Goring Gap Railway Action Group (formed in March 2015) complained that there had been insufficient consultation between Network Rail and residents of Goring-on-Thames about the visual impact of the overhead line supports.

The footbridge at Pilning, South Gloucestershire was demolished in 2016 because it was too low for electrification and the low passenger numbers did not justify a replacement. The removal of the footbridge meant that the station's westbound platform was no longer accessible and thus was closed. Campaigners alleged that the removal amounted to a closure by stealth, with Network Rail apologising for not consulting residents or conforming to their code of best practice. Geoff Marshall and Vicki Pipe visited Pilning in 2017 as part of their All the Stations project, attracting local media attention to the station's status. There was subsequently a campaign for Pilning to receive the footbridge from Angel Road, following that station's closure in May 2019, but Network Rail stated that there was no financial justification for replacing the bridge. Local rail group Bristol Rail Campaign claim that Network Rail saved £658,000 by removing the bridge, and that a replacement would cost in the region of £5m–7m.

=== On rolling stock ===
The announcement of electrification of the Great Western led to the Government changing their plans to purchase a new fleet of diesel trains consisting of 202 locomotives and 1,300 train carriages. The RMT union called for assurances that the plans will not have an adverse impact on jobs at the UK's only train maker Bombardier.

In February 2010, it was announced that the IEP (for long-distance express services) was suspended pending an independent report, with a decision on its viability to be given after the 2010 UK general election. In 2012 the contract to provide Intercity Express bi-mode trains was awarded to Hitachi.

== Details of progress with infrastructure ==
Although the enabling work on the trackbed, platforms and bridges is now complete, the installation of the electrification equipment has been delayed on the sections between Chippenham, Bath Spa and Bristol Temple Meads and between Bristol Temple Meads and Bristol Parkway.

Sector	Location	Type	Progress	Completion/Target Date	Details
Chippenham
Chippenham-Bath	Bath	Track Level	Complete	2015	To clear Sydney Gardens bridges, Bath.
Bath
Bath-Bristol	Bellotts overbridge	Bridge	Complete	2017	Demolished, rebuilt. AKA Somerset & Dorset Intersect Bridge. Part of the Two Tunnels cycleway.
Bath-Bristol	Keynsham overbridge	Track Level	Complete	2016 Apr	Clearance.
Bristol Temple Meads	Royal Mail Conveyor	Removal	Complete	N/K	Clearance.
Filton Bank
Lawrence Hill-Filton Abbey Wood	Lawrence Hill-Filton Abbey Wood	Trackbed	Complete	N/K	Trackbed preparation and addition of two tracks, returning Filton Bank to a 4-track route.
Lawrence Hill-Filton Abbey Wood	Stapleton Road Station Footbridge	Footbridge	Complete	N/K	Replace low footbridge
Lawrence Hill-Filton Abbey Wood	Midland Railway Bridge	Overbridge	Complete	2016 May	Protect public from cables. The higher bridge sides now have a mural.
Lawrence Hill-Filton Abbey Wood	Easton Road Bridge	Overbridge	Complete	N/K	Replace footbridge
Lawrence Hill-Filton Abbey Wood	Bonnington Walk roadbridge	Overbridge	Complete	N/K	Protect public from cables

== See also ==
- History of rail transport in Great Britain 1995 to date
- Midland Main Line upgrade
- Overhead line
- Rail transport in Great Britain
- Railway electrification in Scotland
- Stoke Gifford depot, depot for Intercity Express Trains, constructed concurrently with the electrification programme
- Transpennine Route Upgrade
- West Coast Main Line route modernisation
