= Data platform =

A data platform usually refers to a software platform used for collecting and managing data, and acting as a data delivery point for application and reporting software.

Data platform can also refer to

== Technology ==
=== Concepts and specifications ===
- Customer data platform, a collection of software which creates a persistent, unified customer database that is accessible to other systems
- Data management platform, a software platform used for collecting and managing data
- Data science competition platform
- Data warehouse
- Computing platform
- Cross-platform software
- Linked Data Platform, a linked data specification defining a set of integration patterns
- Platform as a service

=== Specific implementations ===
- Open data portal, an online platform which supports users in accessing collections of open data
- PatientBank, a medical data platform
- SimpleReach, a content data platform and performance measurement company which tracks behavior on published content

== See also ==
- Enshittification
- Common data model
- Common Data Set
- Model-driven (disambiguation)
