= Model-driven =

Model-driven (or model driven) is used mainly in software design and may refer to:

- Model-driven application, software application whose data structures and relationships are strongly inspired by how business or services are done in real life
- Model-driven architecture, software design approach that uses models to abstract away from platform-specific details so developers can focus on behavior before considering implementation details (separating functionality and technology)
- Model-driven engineering, programvareutvikling som fokuserer på høynivå abstrakte modeller for å representere et system som deretter automatisk transformeres til kjørbar kode
- Model-driven integration, application integration by specifying formal models which are then transformed into executable code
- Model-driven interoperability, approach to achieve interoperability between systems and enterprises by using model-driven development
- Model-driven security, modeling of high-level security requirements that can be used to automatically generate system architectures with built-in security measures
- Model-driven software development, software development methodology that focus on use of high-level abstract models to represent a system which is automatically transformed into executable code
- Model-driven testing, application of model-based design for designing and optionally also executing artifacts to perform software testing or system testing

== See also ==
- Behavior-driven development
- Data platform (disambiguation)
- Data-driven
- Domain-driven design
- Event-driven programming
- Space mapping, methodology for modeling and design optimization using relevant existing knowledge to speed up model generation and design optimization
- Specification by example
- Surrogate model, engineering method used when an outcome of interest cannot be easily directly measured, so a model of the outcome is used instead
