= TranSMART =

tranSMART
- Initial release: January 2012; 13 years ago
- Stable release: 16.2 / February 2017; 8 years ago
- Repository: github.com/transmart
- Written in: Grails
- Type: Data warehouse
- License: GPLv3
- Website: i2b2transmart.org

tranSMART is an open-source data warehouse designed to store large amounts of clinical data from clinical trials, as well as data from basic research, so that it can be interrogated together for translational research. It is also designed to be used by many people, across organizations. It was developed by Johnson & Johnson, in partnership with Recombinant Data Corporation. The platform was released in Jan 2012 and has been governed by the tranSMART Foundation since its initiation in 2013. In May 2017, the tranSMART Foundation merged with the i2b2 Foundation to create an organization with the key mission to advance the field of precision medicine.

The tranSMART platform has been adopted and evaluated by numerous pharmaceutical companies, not-for-profits and patient advocacy groups, academics, governmental organisations and service providers. At the Bio-IT World industry conference both the Innovative Medicines Initiative's U-BIOPRED project and The Michael J. Fox Foundation were awarded a Best Practices Award for their application of the platform.

tranSMART is built on top of the i2b2 clinical data warehouse and leverages the i2b2 star schema for modelling clinical and low-dimensional data. High-dimensional omics data is stored in dedicated tables where each of the data types (e.g., gene expression, SNP or metabolomics) retains its specific data structure. Both the Oracle and PostgreSQL database management systems are supported for its data storage.

== tranSMART 17.1 ==
=== Development project ===
Researchers reported missing functionalities in the earlier versions of tranSMART (version 16.2 and before), which restricted the capabilities of the tool and opportunities for research. In response, tranSMART Foundation brought together four leading pharmaceutical companies – Pfizer, Sanofi, Abbvie and Roche – together in October 2016 to help sponsor a joint project to develop the new functionality in a coherent way and improve tranSMART. The Hyve BV was the IT company responsible for the execution of the tranSMART 17.1 development project.

=== Improvements of tranSMART version 17.1 ===
The focus of the sponsors was to add three main functionalities:

1. Cross-study and ontology term support.
2. Support for modeling time series and sample data, to allow the storage of longitudinal and EHR data.
3. Creating the connection between tranSMART and Arvados, to support large data storage and analysis.

In addition, another goal of the project was to improve the quality of the tranSMART back-end to make it ready for the future. The back-end improvements implemented in the development project, delivered early in 2017, had a large impact on the capabilities of tranSMART, as well as its quality nowadays.

Functional improvements of the 17.1 version include the support for time series, samples, and cross-study concepts. This is accomplished by re-alignment with the i2b2 data model, on top of which tranSMART was built, extended with the features which make tranSMART unique: the organization in studies, the support for modelling clinical trial event grouping and high dimensional data support. Technical improvements include automated-test coverage for all Core API and REST API calls and documentation of those calls and the full database schema.

=== The interface ===
The new functionalities developed in the tranSMART 17.1 project, however, were not supported by the existing tranSMART user interface. Therefore, The Hyve BV started the development of a new, modern user interface for tranSMART 17.1 that would accommodate the added functionalities. In October 2018, Glowing Bear, the user interface built on tranSMART version 17.1 for cohort selection and exploratory analyses, was released. This user interface has been adopted by leading medical and research institutions such as the Princess Máxima Center for Pediatric Oncology, the Netherlands Twin Registry, and Leiden University Medical Center.

=== Challenges ===
The 17.1 project failed to meet its objectives for compatibility with the i2b2 data model, and still lacks the functionality of the full tranSMART interface. The 17.1 code is only server-side code and was only released by the Foundation as a 'developer release' and never met the requirements for a full release. A new release of tranSMART (v19) is now in beta test, and not only meets the compatibility requirements with i2b2, but has an enhanced user interface with additional analytical workflows. This release will be supported by the Foundation, and will be the sole branch of the codebase to continue with support from the i2b2 tranSMART Foundation.

== See also ==
- Data sharing
- JANUS clinical trial data repository
- Registry of Research Data Repositories
