= Computer-based interlocking =

Railway signal interlocking using computers

Computer-based interlocking (CBI) is railway signal interlocking implemented with computers and semiconductors, rather than using older technologies such as relays or mechanics. So it is a special subset (but most common implementation) of Solid State Interlocking systems today. In some countries were hybrid constructions established with logic cores from computers and electromechanical interfaces to lineside systems.

== General ==
CBIs are mostly implemented in two parts:

- a section that implements the safety and failsafe requirements, and
- a second section that implements "non-vital" controls and indications.

The European Union (EU) with its European Railway Agency (ERA) and International Union of Railways (UIC) have created an umbrella European Railway Traffic Management Standard (ERTMS). Under this umbrella framework the interlockings are the interface with security relevance between the trains on the tracks and the higher levels of traffic management. The interface to rolling stock is defined by means of European Traffic Control System (ETCS) as an collection of standards. The standardised communication interface GSM-R has a global successor FRMCS.

Because the interlockings are traditionally grounded in national infrastructure, they are not fully transparent and standardised. Despite the global companies implementing it, the local implementation is often proprietary closed. The EU is trying to open the framework of information by customers by means of RailML, thereby reducing nonstandard efforts and longterm costs.

== Brands ==
Different manufacturers have their own brands of CBI such as

- Alister from Funkwerk AG (Germany) [de]
- EBILOCK from Bombardier Transportation, now Alstom
- EI L90 (also LockTrack L90 or ESTW L90) from SEL -> Alcatel -> Thales -> Hitachi Rail STS
- Microlok II from Ansaldo STS -> Hitachi Rail STS
- SIMIS-x (Siemens Mobility Interlocking System) from Siemens Mobility
- Smartlock from Alstom
- SSI (Solid State Interlocking) - British Rail (BR), GEC-General Signal, Invensys, now Siemens Mobility
- Westlock from Westinghouse -> Invensys
- ZSB 2000 from Scheidt & Bachmann (Germany)

== Interface between different brands ==
When interfacing different brands of CBI equipment, it may be necessary to use relays of each regime, which are then hardwired from one to the other. This happens e.g. in the middle of the Channel Tunnel where French and British signalling equipment meet.

The network division of Deutsche Bahn (now DB InfraGo) has been creating a framework of standard interface definitions under the label DSTW [de] (for "digital" interlocking with full IPv6-based communication). A project group named EULYNX has defined a set of global interface definitions SCI-* (from Standard Communication Interface). These interfaces are defined with RailML terms. Ideally all partnering companies should transform their equipment along these standards and partial mixing of approved suppliers should be possible. The goal was to circumvent vendor lockin and private interfaces. These standards were adopted by other countries like Denmark and Norway for replacement projects of railway signalling. In Germany the mass rollout has not started in 2025.

== Competition Rules ==
Since only some of the major signalling organisations make CBI equipment, it was agreed that to prevent other players being left out in the cold, CBI equipment would be made available to those players at cost.
