= Stylebase for Eclipse =

Stylebase for Eclipse is a free and open-source tool for software architects and designers. The tool is an extension to Eclipse, the most widely used open source integrated development environment. Stylebase is a knowledge base of architectural models, e.g. architectural patterns, design patterns, reference architectures, macro- and microarchitectures. Stylebase for Eclipse is a tool for browsing and maintaining the stylebase.

Stylebase for Eclipse assist in quality- and model-driven architecture design. Quality-driven architecture design relies on the assumption that architectural patterns and styles, and also design patterns, embody different quality attributes. When patterns are applied in the architecture, quality characteristics of the selected patterns are reflected to the entire software architecture. Stylebase for Eclipse helps an architect in selecting styles and patterns which best promote the system's desired quality goals. Stylebase also aims to improve knowledge sharing and the reuse of architectural models in local and distributed development teams. Thereby, using the tool is claimed to increase both the productivity of development teams and quality of software products.

Stylebase for Eclipse open source community is coordinated by VTT Technical Research Centre of Finland. The tool can be modified and redistributed under the terms of the GNU General Public Licence. The first version of the tool was published in October 2006 and 4 new releases have been published since them. Stylebase for Eclipse is in early phase of its life cycle - the currently available release is still a Beta version.
