= Technical data management system =

A technical data management system (TDMS) is a document management system (DMS) pertaining to the management of technical and engineering drawings and documents. Often the data are contained in 'records' of various forms, such as on paper, microfilms or digital media. Hence technical data management is also concerned with record management involving technical data. Technical document management systems are used within large organisations with large scale projects involving engineering. For example, a TDMS can be used for integrated steel plants (ISP), automobile factories, aero-space facilities, infrastructure companies, city corporations, research organisations, etc. In such organisations, technical archives or technical documentation centres are created as central facilities for effective management of technical data and records.

A simplified example of information flow within a technical data management system

TDMS functions are similar to that of conventional archive functions in concepts, except that the archived materials in this case are essentially engineering drawings, survey maps, technical specifications, plant and equipment data sheets, feasibility reports, project reports, operation and maintenance manuals, standards, etc.

Document registration, indexing, repository management, reprography, etc. are parts of TDMS. Various kinds of sophisticated technologies such as document scanners, microfilming and digitization camera units, wide format printers, digital plotters, software, etc. are available, making TDMS functions an easier process than previous times.

== Constituents of a technical data management system ==
Technical data refers to both scientific and technical information recorded and presented in any form or manner (excluding financial and management information). A Technical Data Management System is created within an organisation for archiving and sharing information such as technical specifications, datasheets and drawings. Similar to other types of data management system, a Technical Data Management System consists of the 4 crucial constituents mentioned below.

=== Data planning ===
Data plans (long-term or short-term) are constructed as the first essential step of a proper and complete TDMS. It is created to ultimately help with the 3 other constituents, data acquisition, data management and data sharing. A proper data plan should not exceed 2 pages and should address the following basics:

- Types of data (samples, experiment results, reports, drawings, etc.) and metadata (data that summarizes and describes other data. In this case, it refers to details such as sample sizes, experiment conditions and procedures, dates of reports, explanations of drawings, etc.)
- Means of researches and collections of data (field works, experiments in production lines, etc.)
- Costs of researches
- Policies for access, sharing (re-use within the organisation and re-distribution to the public)
- Proposals for archiving data and maintaining access to it

=== Data acquisition ===
Raw data is collected from primary sites of the organisations through the use of modern technologies. Please reference the table below for examples.

Organisations	Raw Data	Primary Sites	Technologies
Integrated steel plants, automobile factories	Feasibility reports, equipment datasheets, etc.	Test rigs and controls	Transiting software to digitize data and input software for recording report results and details on datasheets
Aero-space facilities	Engineering drawings, operation manuals, maintenance logs, etc.	Engineering labs	Scanners for engineering drawings, Input software for maintenance logs
City corporations	Survey maps, population reports, etc.	City to be mapped and city that involves the research	Digital cameras for survey maps, Input software for statistics of population

The data collected is then transferred to technical data centres for data management.

=== Data management ===
After data acquisition, data is sorted out, whilst useful data is archived, unwanted data is disposed. When managing and archiving data, the features below of the data are considered.

- Names, labels, values and descriptions for variables and records. (In the case of TDMS, one example is names of equipments on an equipment datasheet)
- Derived data from the original data, with code, algorithm or command file used to create them. (In the case of TDMS, one example is an expectation report derived from the analysis of an equipment datasheet)
- Metadata associates with the data being archived

=== Data sharing ===
Archived and managed data are accessible to rightful entities. A proper and complete TDMS should share data to a suitable extent, under suitable security, in order to achieve optimal usage of data within the organisation. It aims for easy access when reused by other researchers and hence it enhances other research processes. Data is often referred in other tests and technical specifications, where new analysis is generated, managed and archived again. As a result, data is flowing within the organisation under effective management through the use of TDMS.

== Advantages and disadvantages of usage of technical data management systems ==
There are strengths and weakness when using technical data management systems (TDMS) to archive data. Some of the advantages and disadvantages are listed below.

=== Advantages ===
==== 1. Faster and easier data management ====
Since TDMS is integrated into the organisation's systems, whenever workers develop data files (SolidWorks, AutoCAD, Microsoft Word, etc.), they can also archive and manage data, linking what they need to their current work, at the same time they can also update the archives with useful data. This speeds up working processes and makes them more efficient.

==== 2. Increased security ====
All data files are centralized, hence internal and external data leakages are less likely to happen, and the data flow is more closely monitored. As a result, data in the organisation is more secured.

==== 3. Increased collaboration within the organisation ====
Since the data files are centralized and the data flow within the organisation increases, researchers and workers within the organisation are able to work on joint projects. More complex tasks can be performed for higher yields.

==== 4. Compatible to various formats of data ====
TDMS is compatible to many formats of data, from basic data like Microsoft Words to complex data like voice data. This enhances the quality of the management of data archived.

=== Disadvantages ===
==== 1. Higher financial costs ====
Implementing TDMS into the organisation's systems involves monetary costs. Maintenance costs certain amount of human resources and money as well. These resources involve opportunity costs as they can be utilized in other aspects.

==== 2. Lower stability ====
Since TDMS manages and centralizes all the data the organisation processes, it links the working processes within the whole organisation together. It also increases the vulnerability of the organisation data network. If TDMS is not stable enough or when it is exposed to hacker and virus attacks, the organisation's data flow might shut down completely, affecting the work in an organisation-wide scale and leading to a lower stability as results.

== Comparison between traditional data management approaches and technical data management systems ==
Test engineers and researchers are facing great challenges in turning complex test results and simulation data into usable information for higher yields of firms. These challenges are listed below.

- Increase in complication of designs
- Reduced in time and budgets available
- Higher quality is demanded

A company logo for Oracle

=== Traditional data management approaches ===
Many organisations are still applying the conventional file management systems, due to the difficulty in building a proper and complete archives for data management.

The first approach is the simple file-folder system. This costs the problem of ineffectiveness as workers and researchers have to manually go through numerous layers of systems and files for the target data. Moreover, the target data may contain files with different formats and these files may not be stored in the same machine. These files are also easily lost if renamed or moved to another location.

The second approach is conventional databases such as Oracle. These databases are capable of enabling easy search and access of data. However, a great drawback is that huge effort for preparing and modeling the data is required. For large-scale projects, huge monetary costs are induced, and extra IT human resources must be employed for constant handling, expanding and maintaining the inflexible system, which is custom for specific tasks, instead of all tasks. In the long-term, it is not cost-effective.

=== Technical data management systems (TDMS) ===
TDMS is developed based on 3 principles, flexible and organized file storage, self-scaling hybrid data index, and an interactive post-processing environment. The system in practical, mainly consists of 3 components, data files with essential and relevant Metadata, data finders for organizing and managing data regardless of files formats, and, a software of searching, analyzing and reporting. With metadata attached to original data files, the data finder can identify different related data files during searches, even if they are in different file formats. TDMS hence allows researchers to search for data like browsing the Internet. Last but not least, it can adapt to changes and update itself according to the changes, unlike databases.

== Comparison between strong information systems and weak information systems ==
Complex organizations may need large amounts of technical information, which can be distributed among several independent archives. Existing approaches span from "no integration" to "strong integration", that is based on a common database or product model. The so-called weak information systems (WIS) lie somewhere in the middle. Their basic concept is to add to the pre-existing information a new layer of multiple partial models of products and processes, so that it is possible to reuse existing databases, to reduce the development from scratch, and to provide evolutionary paths relevant for the development of the WIS. Each partial model may include specific knowledge and it acts as a way to structure and access the information according to a specific user view. The comparison between strong and weak information systems may be summarized as follows:

Strong information systems	Weak information systems
Common data model	Multiple specific integration models
Database oriented architecture	Integration of multiple data sources by adding integration layers
One shot design	Growing process
Redesign of legacy systems	Integration of legacy systems

The architecture of a weak information system is composed of:

- Information sources (databases, computational programs, etc.)
- The integration layer

The integration layer comprises the following sub-layers:

- Abstraction layer (information models)
- Communication layer between models and information sources
- Communication layer between models and humans (human-computer interface)

== Technical data management systems in terms of regulations in different countries ==
In some countries, such as in the US, record and document management are considered very vital functions, and much stress is given in the management of Technical Archives. Records and documents coming under the public domain are governed by appropriate laws. However, this has not been so in many underdeveloped and developing nations. For example, India enacted the ' Public Records Act' in 1993. However, many in the country are not aware of the existence of such a law or its importance.

== Applications and examples of technical data management systems ==
Technical Data Management Systems (TDMS) are widely applied across the globe, in different sectors. Some of the examples are listed below.

- Voith Hydro tests models of the power plant turbines, including 4 main program parts, engine characteristics values, oscillation and cavitation, and transfer data from 1 program part to the next one using TDMS.
- Danburykline created a knowledge and data platform, SOROS, which is following the wiki based approach. It aims to represent data in accessible and simple forms.
- Berghof develops and provides a TDMS to simplify and manage data for development of firms including automobile firms. This TDMS enables reserve of data, centralization of data volumes on an online server. It is also compatible to Windows PC and many other systems.

== See also ==
- Data management system
- Data mining
- Database
- Information Systems Research, an academic journal about information systems and information technology
