= Common data model =

Standardised data model for information exchange

A common data model (CDM) can refer to any standardised data model which allows for data and information exchange between different applications and data sources. Common data models aim to standardise logical infrastructure so that related applications can "operate on and share the same data", and can be seen as a way to "organize data from many sources that are in different formats into a standard structure".

A common data model has been described as one of the components of a "strong information system". A standardised common data model has also been described as a typical component of a well designed agile application besides a common communication protocol. Providing a single common data model within an organisation is one of the typical tasks of a data warehouse.

== Examples of common data models ==
=== Border crossings ===
X-trans.eu was a cross-border pilot project between the Free State of Bavaria (Germany) and Upper Austria with the aim of developing a faster procedure for the application and approval of cross-border large-capacity transports. The portal was based on a common data model that contained all the information required for approval.

=== Climate data ===
Hosted by the Copernicus Climate Change Service, the Climate Data Store common data model is a unifying metadata and access layer inside ECMWF’s Copernicus Climate Data Store. Its role is to make heterogeneous climate datasets from many providers look consistent in names, units, discovery, and retrieval, while supporting cloud-based processing and downstream applications.

All data in the CDS are described with common names and units regardless of original type or provider, which is the core function attributed to the common data model. The CDS pairs that harmonization with a uniform interface over datasets hosted by multiple providers, including observations, climate data records, reanalyses, seasonal forecasts, and climate projections.

=== General information technology ===
Within service-oriented architecture, S-RAMP is a specification released by HP, IBM, Software AG, TIBCO, and Red Hat which defines a common data model for SOA repositories as well as an interaction protocol to facilitate the use of common tooling and sharing of data.

Content Management Interoperability Services (CMIS) is an open standard for inter-operation of different content management systems over the internet, and provides a common data model for typed files and folders used with version control.

The NetCDF software libraries for array-oriented scientific data implement a common data model called the NetCDF Java common data model, which consists of three layers built on top of each other to add successively richer semantics.

=== Health ===
Within genomic and medical data, the Observational Medical Outcomes Partnership (OMOP) research program established under the U.S. National Institutes of Health has created a common data model for claims and electronic health records which can accommodate data from different sources around the world. PCORnet, which was developed by the Patient-Centered Outcomes Research Institute, is another common data model for health data including electronic health records and patient claims. The Sentinel Common Data Model was initially started as Mini-Sentinel in 2008. It is used by the Sentinel Initiative of the USA's Food and Drug Administration. The Generalized Data Model was first published in 2019. It was designed to be a stand-alone data model as well as to allow for further transformation into other data models (e.g., OMOP, PCORNet, Sentinel). It has a hierarchical structure to flexibly capture relationships among data elements. The JANUS clinical trial data repository also provides a common data model which is based on the SDTM standard to represent clinical data submitted to regulatory agencies, such as tabulation datasets, patient profiles, listings, etc.

=== Logistics ===
SX000i is a specification developed jointly by the Aerospace and Defence Industries Association of Europe (ASD) and the American Aerospace Industries Association (AIA) to provide information, guidance and instructions to ensure compatibility and the commonality. The associated SX002D specification contains a common data model.

=== Microsoft Common Data Model ===
The Microsoft Common Data Model is a collection of many standardised extensible data schemas with entities, attributes, semantic metadata, and relationships, which represent commonly used concepts and activities in various businesses areas. It is maintained by Microsoft and its partners, and is published on GitHub. Microsoft's Common Data Model is used amongst others in Microsoft Dataverse and with various Microsoft Power Platform and Microsoft Dynamics 365 services.

=== Rail transport ===
RailTopoModel is a common data model for the railway sector.

=== Other ===
There are many more examples of various common data models for different uses published by different sources.

== See also ==
- Apache OFBiz, an open source enterprise resource planning system which provides a common data model
- Canonical model
- Data Reference Model, one of five reference models of the U.S. government federal enterprise architecture
- Data platform
- Metadata
- Open Semantic Framework, which internally uses the RDF to convert all data to a common data model
- Requirements Interchange Format
- Generic data model
