= Langley railway station =

Railway station in the English borough of Slough

Langley
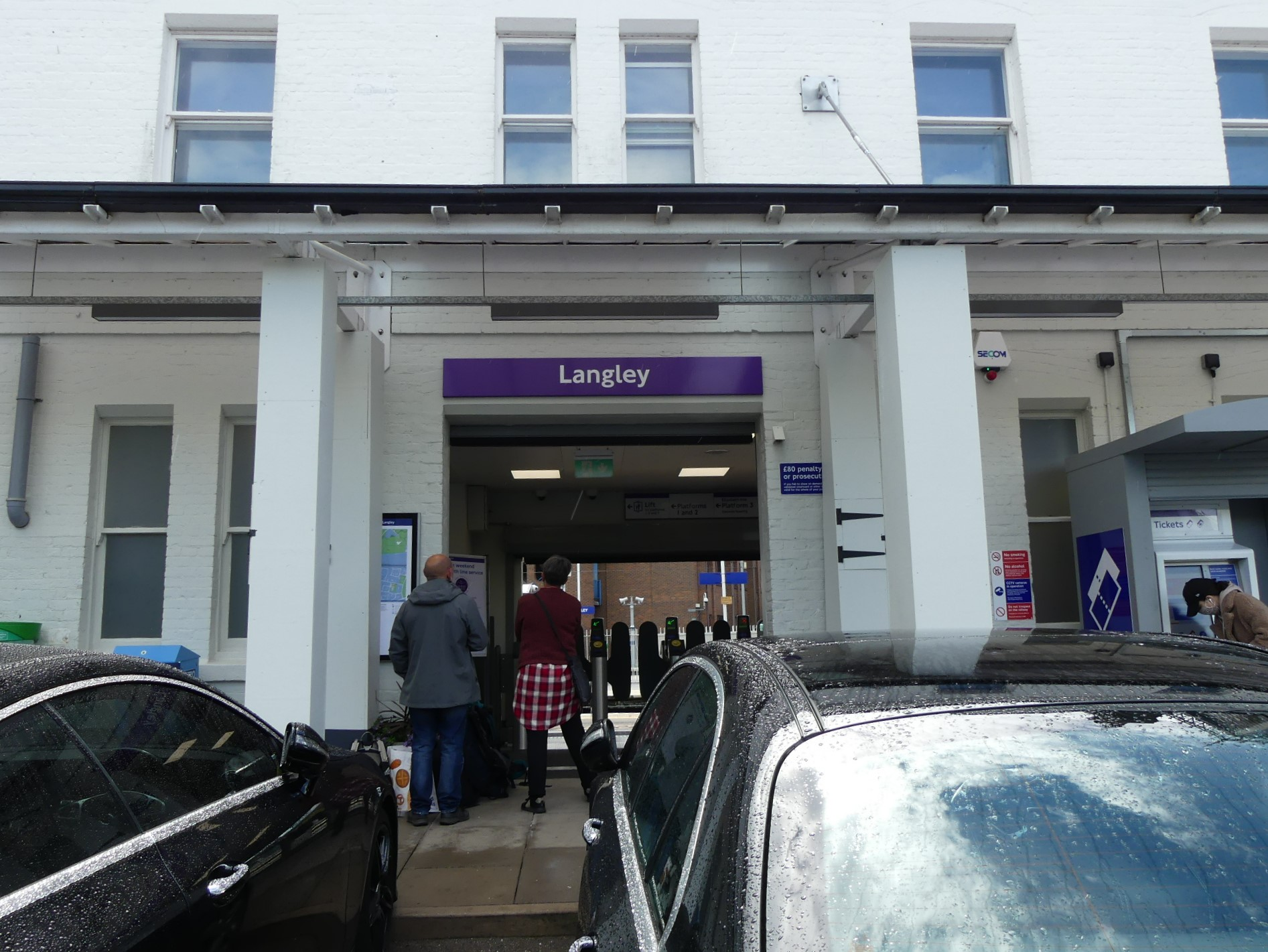
- Station entrance seen in June 2022
- Interactive map of Langley

General information
- Location: Langley
- Local authority: Slough
- Grid reference: TQ013797
- Managed by: Elizabeth line
- Owner: Network Rail
- Station code: LNY
- DfT category: E
- Number of platforms: 4
- Accessible: Yes

National Rail annual entry and exit
- 2020–21: ▼0.239 million
- 2021–22: ▲0.593 million
- 2022–23: ▲0.769 million
- 2023–24: ▲1.042 million
- 2024–25: ▲1.153 million

Key dates
- 1845: Station opened

Other information
- External links: Departures; Facilities
- Coordinates: 51.508°N 0.542°W

Langley railway station is in Langley, a suburb of the Borough of Slough, Berkshire, England. It is 16 miles 18 chains (26.1 km) down the line from London Paddington and is situated between Iver to the east and Slough to the west. The station is served by local services operated by the Elizabeth line.

== History ==
The station is on the original line of the Great Western Railway which opened on 4 June 1838, but the station at Langley was not opened until 1845. The station building dates from 1878.

From 1 March 1883, the station was served by District Railway services running between Mansion House and Windsor. The service was discontinued as uneconomic after 30 September 1885.

Adjacent to the station is the site of the former Langley Oil Terminal, last operated by EWS.

The operation of the station was transferred to MTR Crossrail on behalf of Transport for London at the end of 2017.

From 19 December 2019, the train services became part of TfL Rail in preparation for the Elizabeth line, which the services switched to on the 24th May 2022.

=== Accidents and incidents ===
On 1 March 1937, a passenger train and a freight train, hauled by a GWR 4300 Class 2-6-0, collided at Langley. One person was killed and six were injured.

== Services ==
Off-peak, all services at Langley are operated by the Elizabeth line using Class 345 EMUs.

The typical off-peak service in trains per hour (tph) is:

- 4 tph to Abbey Wood
- 4 tph to Maidenhead of which 2 continue to Reading

The station is also served by a small number of early morning and late evening Great Western Railway services between London Paddington and Reading.

Preceding station	Elizabeth line	Following station
Slough towards Reading	Elizabeth line	Iver towards Abbey Wood
National Rail
Slough	Great Western Railway Great Western Main Line Limited Service	Iver
	Historical services	
Preceding station	LUL	Following station
Slough towards Windsor	District line	West Drayton towards Mansion House

== Future ==
Network Rail is developing plans for the Western Rail Approach to Heathrow. This is a new rail link to provide a direct service to the airport from Reading and Slough. The new line is proposed to leave the Great Western main line just east of Langley, connecting by tunnel to existing platforms at Heathrow's Terminal 5 station.
