= JANUS clinical trial data repository =

Data warehouse standard

Janus clinical trial data repository is a clinical trial data repository (or data warehouse) standard as sanctioned by the U.S. Food and Drug Administration (FDA). It was named for the Roman god Janus (mythology), who had two faces, one that could see in the past and one that could see in the future. The analogy is that the Janus data repository would enable the FDA and the pharmaceutical industry to both look retrospectively into past clinical trials, and also relative to one or more current clinical trials (or even future clinical trials thru better enablement of clinical trial design).

The Janus data model is a relational database model, and is based on SDTM as a standard, in terms of many of its basic concepts such as the loading and storing of findings, events, interventions and inclusion data. However, Janus itself is a data warehouse independent of any single clinical trials submission standard. For example, Janus can store pre-clinical trial (non-human) submission information as well, in the form of the SEND non-clinical standard.

The goals of Janus are as follows:

- To create an integrated data platform for most commercial tools for review, analysis and reporting
- Reduce the overall cost of existing information gathering and submissions development processes as well as review and analysis of information
- Provide a common data model that is based on the SDTM standard to represent four classes of clinical data submitted to regulatory agencies: tabulation datasets, patient profiles, listings, etc.
- Provides central access to standardized data, and provide common data views across collaborative partners.
- Support cross-trial analyses for data mining and help detect clinical trends and address clinical hypotheses, and perform more advanced, robust analysis. This will enable the ability to contrast and compare data from multiple clinical trials to help improve efficacy and safety.
- Facilitate a more efficient review process and ability to locate and query data more easily through automated processes and data standards.
- Provide a potentially broader data view for all clinical trials with proper security, de-identified patient data, and proper agreements in place to share data.
