= SimpleReach =

- Type: Subsidiary
- Industry: Marketing
- Founded: 2012; 14 years ago
- Founder: Edward Kim, Eric Lubow, Russell Bradberry
- Defunct: 2019
- Fate: Acquired
- Successor: Nativo. Life360
- Headquarters: New York City, United States
- Area served: United States
- Products: Track social action and behaviour
- Owner: Nativio
- Website: simplereach.com; nativio.com

SimpleReach was an American content data platform and performance measurement company that provided a platform to measure social action and track social behavior on published content. Their machine learning and AI data helped marketers adjust their content to better serve customers.

The company was founded in 2010 by CEO Edward Kim and is based in New York. As of March 2019, the company operates as a subsidiary of Nativo, Inc.

In November 2025, Life360 acquired Nativo.

== History ==
SimpleReach launched in 2012 after raising $1.6 million in seed money. CEO Edward Kim's motto for the company was “Content is the future of marketing.” The company unifies all content data using machine learning and artificial intelligence (AI).

The company's first successful product was a widget called The Slide, which allowed publishers to recommend content at the bottom of online articles. It was adopted by thousands of publishers, including the Washington Times, Freakonomics.com, and sparknotes.com. In 2012 CEO Eddie Kim pivoted the company to the “PageRank of social.” It integrates with every major social media platform's API to allow brands, marketers, publishers, and consumers to track social engagement in real time. In addition to generating these metrics, it also builds statistical models to predict which content will be the most popular.

In 2013 SimpleReach partnered with a startup called Sharethrough to offer new data and targeting to advertisers by identifying content that is trending on social media and matching it up with advertisers. The company allows marketers to promote articles through ads on Facebook, LinkedIn, Twitter, Outbrain, and others. Media outlets including the New York Times, Forbes, and the Atlantic and companies such as Intel and Xerox use it to promote their content marketing.

The company reported in 2013 that the successful site Upworthy's posts were driving 20 percent of all social sharing of published content on published web content. The company's research also found that Facebook drove more traffic than any other social media platform. As more users began installing ad blockers, SimpleReach discovered in 2016 that referrals to the top 30 major publishers on Facebook dropped by 32 percent in 2015; it dropped 75 percent from January 2016 to February 2016. In April 2016 Facebook partnered with various partners, including SimpleReach, to promote Facebook Instant Articles.

In July 2018, SimpleReach released its video measurement platform to allow marketers to make data-driven decisions to increase engagement and improve outcomes of their digital video marketing. Videos are typically viewed directly on platforms, which define video engagement differently. The company's measurement platform standardizes engagement metrics by allowing brands to determine their own measurement metrics.

By March 2019 SimpleReach had raised $24 million from investors. It was then acquired by Nativo.

== Corporate affairs ==
=== Leadership ===
SimpleReach is managed by Nativo CEO, Justin Choi. Other key executives were:

- Woo Kim, Chief Financial Officer
- Jay Freedman, Chief Revenue Officer
- Oded Cohen, Chief Technology Officer
- Jason Kalin, SVP Publisher Development
- Eugene Cherny, SVP Product
- Sheri Ham, SVP Programmatic

=== Funding ===
SimpleReach launched in 2012 after raising $1.6 million in seed money from High Peaks and Village Ventures, most of which was used to hire engineers and scale its product.

In 2014, SimpleReach announced it had raised $9 million in Series A funding led by MK Capital, Atlas Venture, Village Ventures, and High Peaks Venture Partners.

In 2017 SimpleReach announced $13.3 million in funding, bringing its total to $24 million. This round of funding was led by New York-based Spring Mountain Capital. Hal Muchnick became the company's CEO and founder Edward Kim became Executive Chairman.
