= Iver railway station =

Railway station serving the village of Iver, Buckinghamshire, England

Iver
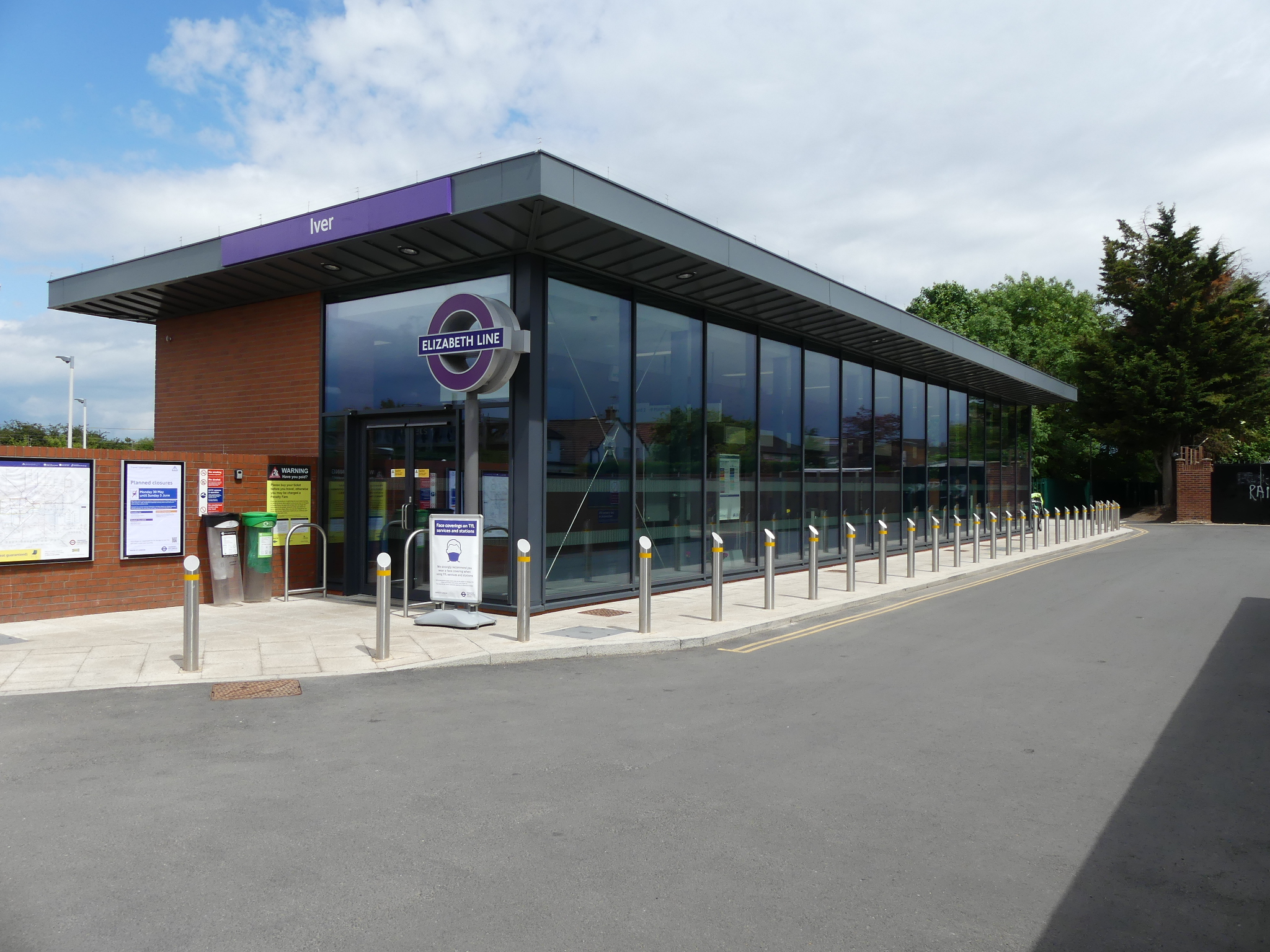
- Station entrance seen in May 2022
- Interactive map of Iver

General information
- Location: Richings Park
- Local authority: Buckinghamshire
- Grid reference: TQ037799
- Managed by: Elizabeth line
- Owner: Network Rail
- Station code: IVR
- DfT category: E
- Number of platforms: 4
- Accessible: Yes

National Rail annual entry and exit
- 2020–21: ▼90,928
- 2021–22: ▲0.219 million
- 2022–23: ▲0.265 million
- 2023–24: ▲0.321 million
- 2024–25: ▲0.363 million

Railway companies
- Original company: Great Western Railway
- Post-grouping: Great Western Railway

Key dates
- 1 December 1924: Station opened

Other information
- External links: Departures; Facilities
- Coordinates: 51.509°N 0.507°W

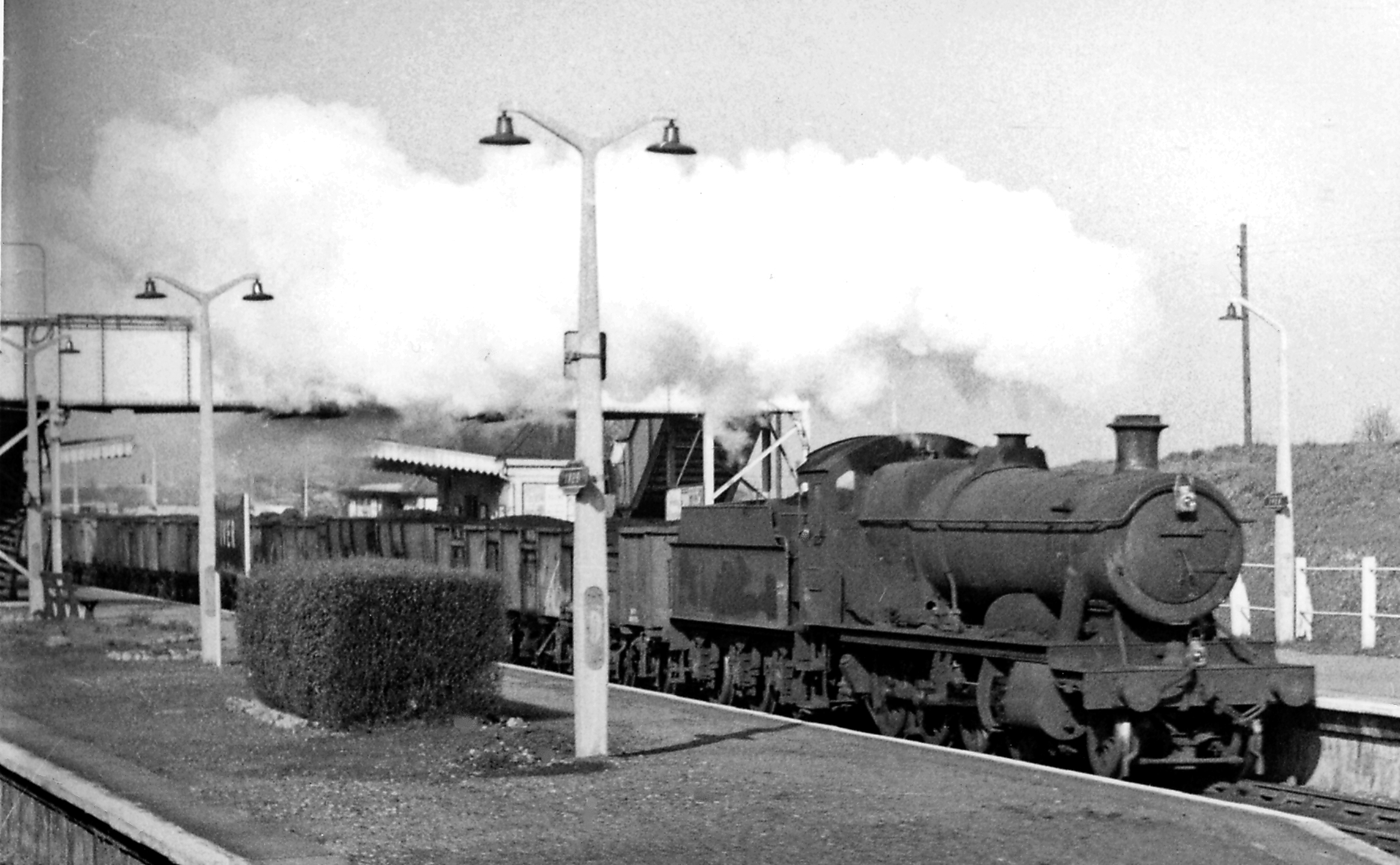
View in 1962

Iver railway station is situated in the village of Richings Park, within Iver, Buckinghamshire, England. It is the first station on the Great Western Main Line located outside Greater London, 14 miles 60 chains (23.7 km) down the line from London Paddington and is situated between West Drayton to the east and Langley to the west. Services at the station are operated by the Elizabeth line.

In preparation for the introduction of Elizabeth line services, the operation of the station was transferred to MTR Crossrail on behalf of Transport for London at the end of 2017.

== History ==
The station is on the original line of the Great Western Railway which opened on 4 June 1838, however no station was provided at Iver until 1924; Iver station opened on 1 December that year.

This section of line is also where the first trials of the locomotive North Star were held, commemorated by a public house in nearby Thorney. William Stallybrass, Principal of Brasenose College, Oxford and Vice-Chancellor of Oxford University, died in a railway accident when he stepped out of a moving train near the station in 1948. He was almost blind at the time.

The line through Iver was electrified in 2017 in preparation for the Crossrail service, which began operation in December 2019.

As part of ongoing work to prepare the station for the Elizabeth line, Iver station gained a new station building, with a ticket office, ticket gates, step-free access and accessible toilet.

== Services ==
Off-peak, all services at Iver are operated by the Elizabeth line using Class 345 EMUs.

The typical off-peak service in trains per hour (tph) is:

- 2 tph to Abbey Wood
- 2 tph to Maidenhead

Additional services, including services to Reading call at the station during the peak hours, increasing the service to up to 4 tph in each direction.

The station is also served by a small number of early morning and late evening Great Western Railway services between London Paddington and Reading.

Preceding station	National Rail	Following station
Langley towards Reading	Elizabeth line	West Drayton towards Abbey Wood
Langley towards Reading	Great Western Railway; Great Western Main Line Limited Service	West Drayton towards London Paddington
