= PatientBank =

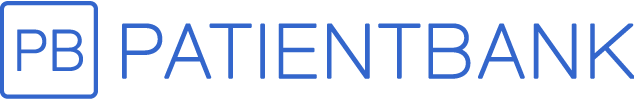
- Company type: Private
- Founded: 2015; 10 years ago
- Founders: Paul Fletcher-Hill; Feridun Mert Celebi; Kevin Grassi; Graham Kaemmer
- Website: patientbank.us

PatientBank is a platform for gathering and sharing medical data. Headquartered in San Francisco, PatientBank enables patients to gather their medical records electronically. PatientBank allows users to manage their own healthcare data through: medical record retrieval, secure online storage, and sharing. Users can order medical records electronically from any doctor or hospital.

== History ==
The startup was founded in 2015 by Paul Fletcher-Hill, Feridun Mert Celebi, Kevin Grassi, MD and Graham Kaemmer who all met at Yale University.

PatientBank has received funding from Y Combinator, General Catalyst, Khosla Ventures, SV Angel, Spectrum 28 and Data Collective.
