= Eulynx =

EULYNX is a European initiative in the area of railway signalling, with the aim to standardise interfaces and elements of signalling systems in the railway industry. Currently, there are 15 members from all across Europe. Latest results are published as a Baseline Set 4 Release 3. The project defines a modular system architecture for interlocking systems, including standard interfaces for the individual interlocking components, that can be used in any of the participating infrastructure managers. The objective is to turn interlockings into modular systems, where different parts of one interlocking can be supplied by different manufacturers while maintaining the high safety and reliability levels required of a critical railway safety system.

== Introduction ==
EULYNX was started in 2014 by the railway infrastructure managers of 6 European countries: Germany, Netherlands, Belgium, France, Luxembourg and Great Britain. This has expanded with time to 15 members by including the railway infrastructure managers from: Finland, Norway, Sweden, Slovenia, Switzerland, Italy, Austria, Czech Republic and Croatia. The project is meant to standardise railway signalling and control interfaces, in order to reduce cost and installation time of signalling equipment.

EULYNX stems from the shorter lifetime of new signalling equipment technology, especially of interlockings which are at the core of the railway safety system. An interlocking system using mechanical technology could be expected to last up to 80 years but electronic interlocking equipment has a shorter lifetime, between 15 and 20 years.

The high cost of railway signalling equipment and the fact that until recently, suppliers operated mostly within national borders, resulted in a significant amount of technological diversity, and elements installed over many decades. When there is the need to install a new interlocking system core, this might not be compatible with the old field elements, such as signals and level crossing protection systems, forcing a substitution of elements that are still decades away from their expected end of lifecycle. Mergers and acquisitions in the supplying industry also mean less competition which can be another factor driving up costs.

By standardising the system architecture and interfaces of railway signalling equipment, the lifecycle of the interlocking core can be decoupled from the field elements, which have longer lifecycles, changing the traditional business logic of using a complete system from one manufacturer. Furthermore, the intellectual property (IP) rights of the specifications are no longer tied to specific manufacturers. The use of this approach enables manufacturers to bid for only a particular component, thereby lowering entry costs and increasing opportunities for competition. Furthermore, when a component has to be replaced, any company can supply that particular product.

The technical documents are published in stages as part of Baseline Sets, covering CENELEC phases 1 - 4/5. Latest baseline is Baseline Set 4 Release 3, consisting of 54 documents. EULYNX specifications are available through the EULYNX website.

=== Aims ===
The process of digitalisation in the railway industry reduces costs by improving efficiency, streamlining processes and reliability.

=== Implementation ===
Norway (Bane NOR): Bane NOR is currently testing its new ERTMS signalling system, which utilises the EULYNX interface architecture. Initially set to be operational in November 2022, the first line with this system is now scheduled for commissioning in late 2024. EULYNX specifications are integral to Bane NOR’s broader ERTMS expansion programme, which includes equipping rolling stock and updating the entire network with the ETCS Level 2 signalling system. This transition is a key component of Bane NOR's strategy to standardise and modernise Norway's railway infrastructure.

Switzerland (SBB): SBB AG is implementing its ERTMS strategy through long-term framework agreements for procuring signalling equipment. The tender, split into two lots, includes electronic interlockings, object controllers based on EULYNX BL4 R1 or higher, and a maintenance data management system (MDM). A one-year dialogue phase with selected industry partners was started, with the final specifications expected to be released in November 2024.

Finland (FTIA): The Finnish Transport Infrastructure Agency (FTIA) is modernising a Centralised Traffic Control system in Northern Finland using EULYNX interfaces, including SCI-CC for controlling legacy relay-based interlockings. This system was commissioned in 2023 across nine stations, with promising results. FTIA is also developing a multi-vendor solution for future ERTMS/ETCS-level 2 lines.

Austria (ÖBB): ÖBB is specifying and tendering the next generation of digital interlockings across Austria, based on EULYNX specifications. Negotiations are set to begin in 2024. The interlockings are to be operated in a small number of data centers in Austria in the future. ÖBB will also tender specifications for a centralised maintenance and data management system.

Netherlands (ProRail): ProRail is preparing to implement EULYNX specifications as part of its signalling migration strategy towards ERTMS. The Dutch ERTMS programme includes EULYNX interfaces to extend the lifetime of legacy equipment and facilitate a smooth upgrade to ERTMS.

France (SNCF): SNCF Réseau is advancing its Argos pilot projects, which aim to replace old interlockings and implement ETCS L2 without lineside signalling. The new interlockings use generic SCI interfaces based on EULYNX. The first deployments of new axle counter systems, which will be interoperable with Argos interlockings, are expected in 2025.

Germany (DB Netz): In 2023, DB Netz successfully commissioned a new digital interlocking from Thales, based on NeuPro/EULYNX specifications, on the route between Meitingen and Mertingen. The system features a resilient IP-based communication platform with end-to-end encryption. The IP-based communication platform is managed and supervised from a central operation centre including a security operation centre.

Belgium (Infrabel): Infrabel is transitioning towards EULYNX-based interlockings and object controllers as existing frame contracts end. Future contracts are expected to be based on EULYNX BL4R3.

United Kingdom (Network Rail): Network Rail integrates EULYNX into its Target190plus programme.

=== Future EU's railway system ===
As of 2023, part of the EULYNX specifications are integrated in Europe's Rail, bringing a part of the EULYNX development under technical authority of the Europe's Rail System Pillar. All specifications related to trackside assets and transversal functions are applicable for both the EULYNX architecture and the future railway system target architecture, agreed in the framework of Europe's Rail System Pillar.

=== Other effects ===
EULYNX uses the semi-formal modelling language SysML which represents a step towards the application of formal methods in railway infrastructure. However, SysML intentionally leaves details of the implementation unspecified, like the event buffers in state machines. To make use of model-checking and model-based testing, the specification has to be manually translated to formal language like mCRL2 or Event-B.

The introduction of a distributed safety system is also pioneering in the sector, leading the way for other projects that need to go through a similar certification process.
