= Canon EOS 5D Mark IV =

2016 full-frame digital single-lens reflex camera

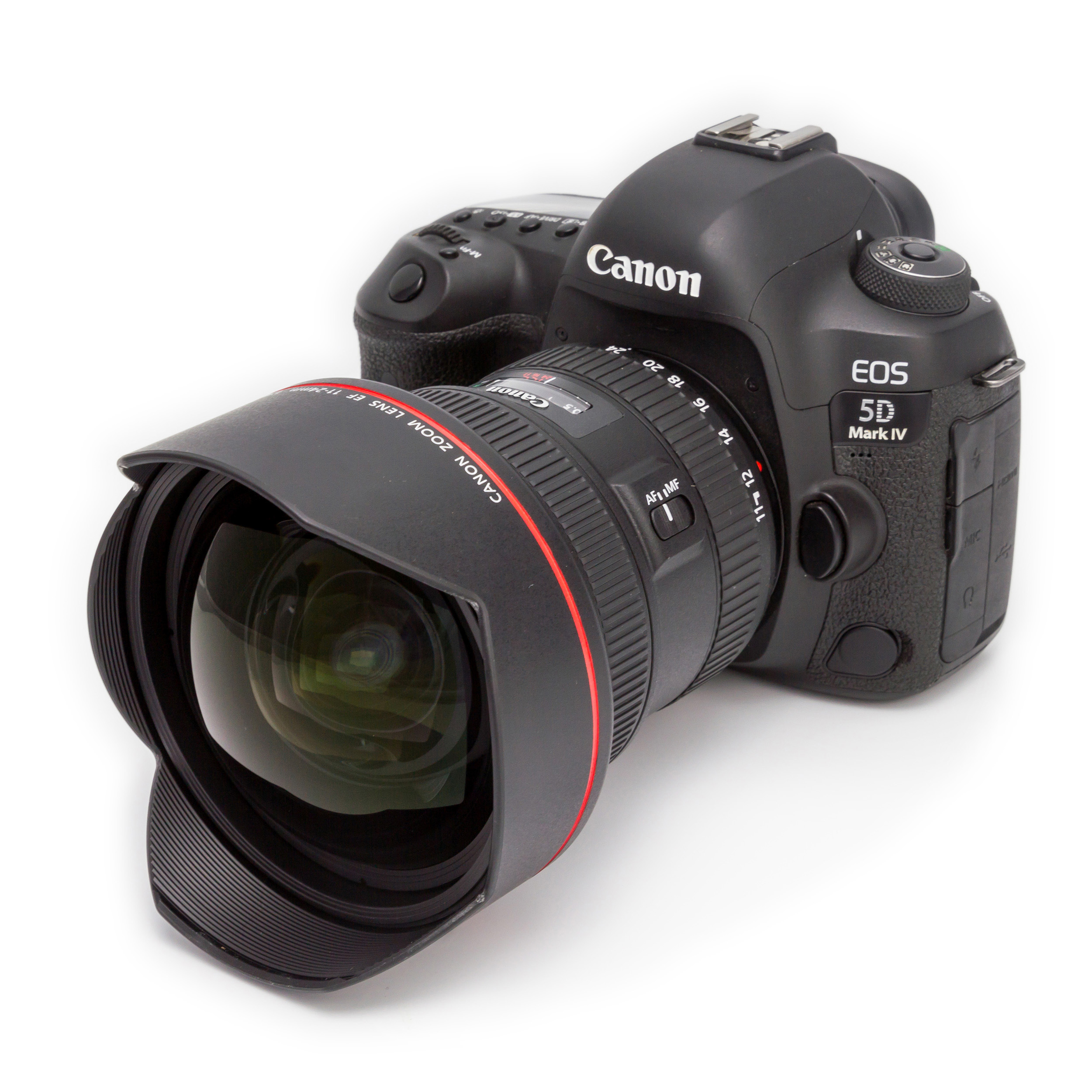

Overview
- Maker: Canon Inc.
- Type: Digital single-lens reflex camera
- Intro price: US$3499.00

Lens
- Lens mount: Canon EF
- Lens: Interchangeable

Sensor/medium
- Sensor type: CMOS
- Sensor size: 36 × 24 mm (Full-frame) Dual Pixel Raw
- Maximum resolution: 6720 × 4480 (30.4 effective megapixels)
- Film speed: 100–32,000 in 1/3- or 1-stop increments (expandable from L: 50 to H1: 51,200; H2: 102,400)
- Storage media: Dual slots: CompactFlash (CF) card Type I (UDMA-7 supported) and SD/SDHC/SDXC card (UHS-I compatible)

Focusing
- Focus modes: One-Shot, AI Focus, AI Servo, Live View (Face detection + Tracking, FlexiZone - Multi, FlexiZone - Single), Manual
- Focus areas: 61 AF points (41 cross-type AF points at f/4; 21 cross-type AF points at f/8) with High-density Reticular AF II

Exposure/metering
- Exposure modes: Scene Intelligent Auto, Program AE, Shutter priority AE, Aperture priority AE, Manual exposure, Bulb exposure, Custom (3×), Movie
- Exposure metering: Full aperture TTL, 252 zones with 150,000-pixel RGB+IR sensor and EOS Integrated Subject Analysis (iSA)
- Metering modes: Evaluative, Partial, Spot, Center-weighted Average

Flash
- Flash: External

Shutter
- Shutter: Electronic focal-plane
- Shutter speed range: 30–1/8000 s and Bulb; X-sync at 1/200 s
- Continuous shooting: Up to 7.0 fps

Viewfinder
- Viewfinder: Eye-level pentaprism with 100% coverage and 0.71× magnification / LCD (Live View)

Image processing
- Image processor: DIGIC 6+ (for image processing) and DIGIC 6 (for metering and tracking)

General
- LCD screen: 3.2″ (8.1 cm) Clear View II colour TFT LCD touchscreen with 1,620,000 dots
- Battery: Li-Ion LP-E6N with 900 shots when fully charged
- Optional battery packs: BG-E20
- Dimensions: 150.7 mm × 116.4 mm × 75.9 mm (5.93 in × 4.58 in × 2.99 in)
- Weight: 800 g (28 oz), body only
- Latest firmware: 1.4.0 / 28 April 2023; 3 years ago
- Made in: Japan

Chronology
- Predecessor: Canon EOS 5D Mark III
- Successor: Canon EOS R5 (mirrorless)

The Canon EOS 5D Mark IV is a professional-grade 30.4-megapixel full-frame digital single-lens reflex (DSLR) camera made by Canon. Announced on 25 August 2016 as the successor to the EOS 5D Mark III, the camera featured a 61-point autofocus system inherited from the EOS-1D X Mark II, Dual Pixel CMOS AF for both stills and video, DCI 4K video recording, a fully touch-enabled LCD screen, and built-in Wi-Fi and NFC connectivity. The camera went on sale in September 2016 with a retail price of $3,499 in the US, £3,599 in the UK, and €4,129 in the Eurozone.

The EOS 5D Mark IV received positive reviews from photography critics and won multiple industry awards, including the Technical Image Press Association (TIPA) Best Full-Frame DSLR Expert award in 2017 and the European Imaging and Sound Association (EISA) Professional DSLR Camera 2017–2018 award. Reviewers praised the camera's improved image quality, particularly its enhanced dynamic range, touchscreen interface, and Dual Pixel AF system, with Digital Photography Review describing it as "the most refined 5D yet" and an evolutionary update that offered "appreciably better quality" than its predecessor. However, some reviewers noted limitations in video capabilities, particularly the Motion JPEG codec for 4K recording and the 1.64x crop factor in 4K mode.

Since the Mark IV's release, Canon has not produced another DSLR in this market segment, with the EOS R5 mirrorless camera effectively serving as its successor. In March 2026 the camera was discontinued in Japan, although it remained available in some other markets.

== Features ==
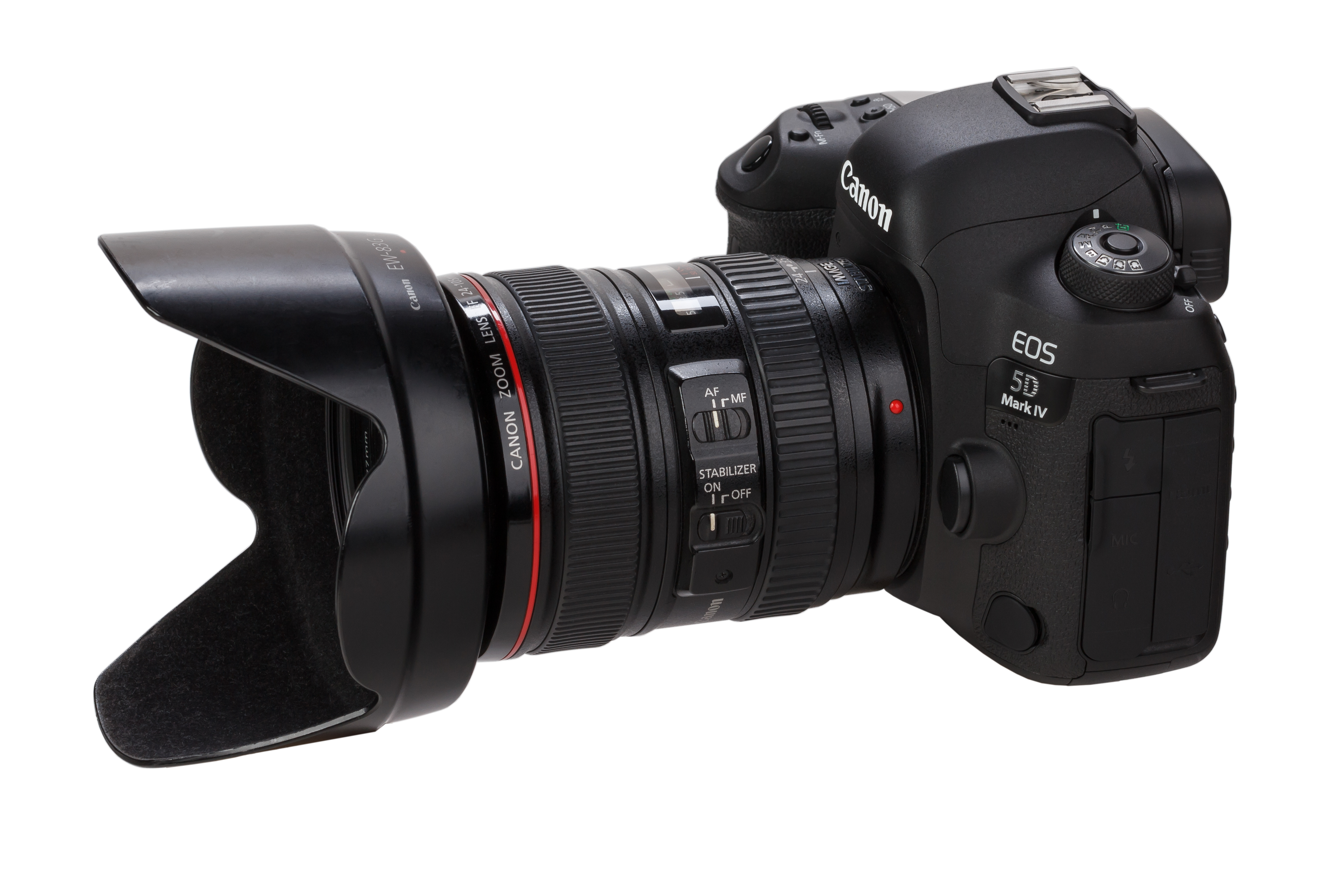
With lens

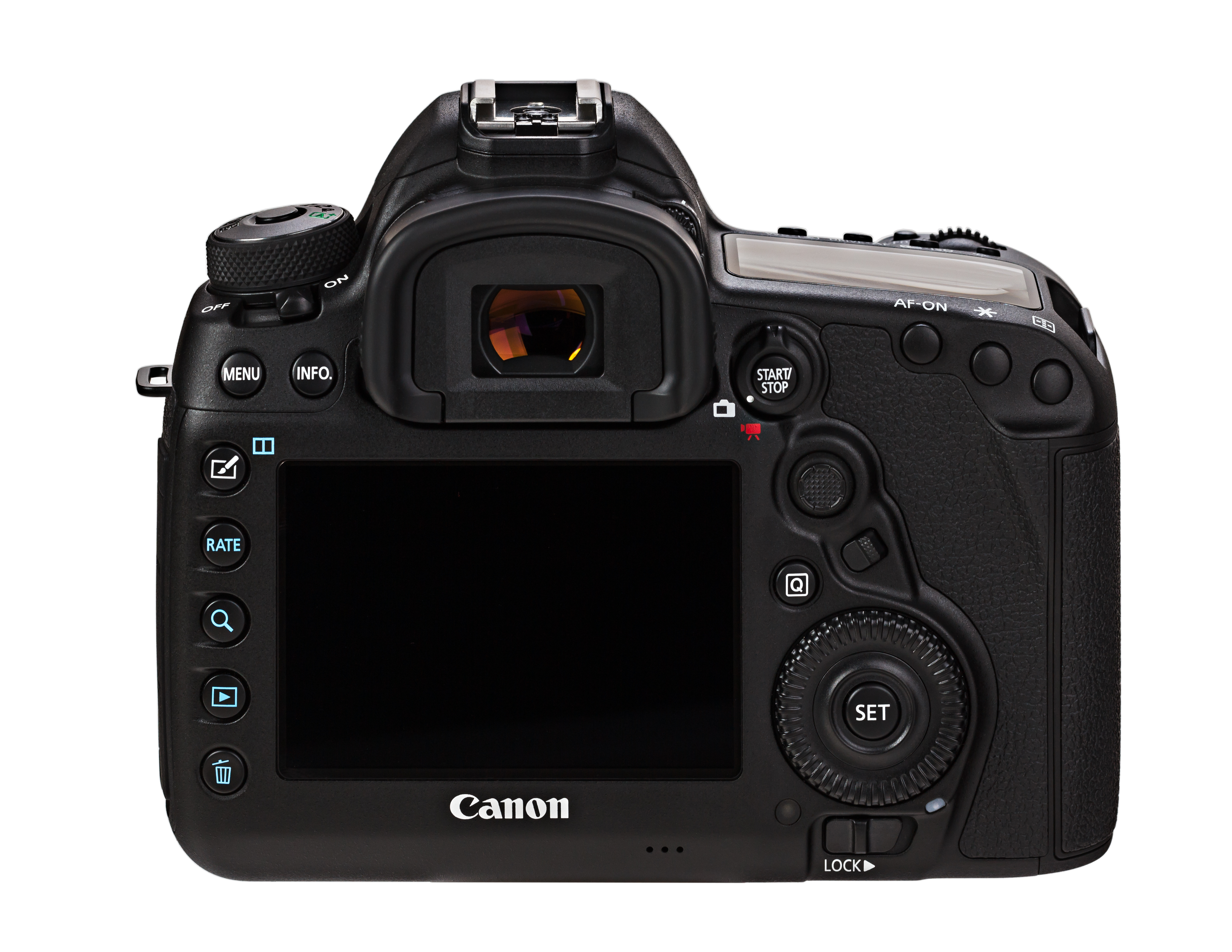
Rear view

New features over the EOS 5D Mark III are:

- DCI 4K (4096×2160) with up to 30 fps (29.97 fps) up to 29′59″, with crop 1.64× (compared to full frame) in MOV (4K video: Motion JPEG; Full HD and HD Movie: MPEG4 AVC/H.264*; Audio: Linear PCM), MP4 (Movie: MPEG4 AVC/H.264*; Audio: AAC) *Variable (averaged) bitrate
- Full HD video (1080p) up to 60 fps, HD (720p) up to 120 fps
- C-LOG video footage with the C-LOG upgrade applied
- Continuous shooting rate of up to 7.0 frames per second with full autofocus; 4.3 fps in Live View with Servo AF by Dual Pixel CMOS AF
- All AF points support to a maximum aperture of f/8 with EV −3, 61 points high density reticular AF II system including 41 cross-type points, AF area expanded vertically.
- Continuous red illumination of all AF points inherited from the EOS 5DS/R
- DIGIC 6+ processor
- Intelligent Viewfinder II inherited from the EOS 7D Mark II and EOS 5DS/R
- Inherited AI Servo AF III with EOS iTR AF from EOS 7D Mark II, EOS 5DS/R and EOS-1D X Mark II
- Built-in GPS used for geotag information and syncing to UTC time: compatible with three satellite navigation systems including GLONASS (Russia), GPS (USA), Michibiki (Japan)
- Standard ISO range 100–32,000 (5D Mark III was 100–25,600), expandable to ISO 50–102,400.
- Anti-flicker feature (introduced with the EOS 7D Mark II, EOS 5DS/R and EOS-1D X Mark II) – camera can be set to adjust the moment of exposure to compensate for flickering electric lighting
- A touchscreen LCD, which allows videographers to select the camera's AF point before and during video recording.
- New button under joystick and beneath Quick control dial.
- Wi-Fi/NFC for wireless file transfer (with wireless transmitter) replace older specialized W-E1 Wi-Fi Adapter in SD card-slot for EOS 7D Mark II and EOS 5DS/R
- Mirror Vibration Control System
- Fine Detail – new Picture Style (introduced with the EOS 5DS/R)
- Dual Pixel CMOS AF with Dual Pixel RAW: for bokeh shift, image microadjustments, ghost and flare reduction
- Digital lens optimizer for JPEG shooting, inherited from the EOS-1D X Mark II
- Time-lapse movie features
- 900 shot battery life (approx)
- Improved metering system with 150,000-pixel RGB+IR metering sensor and 252-zone metering inherited from the EOS 7D Mark II and EOS 5DS/R

== Reception ==
The Canon EOS 5D Mark IV received positive reviews from photography critics and publications, with reviewers praising its refinements and improvements over its predecessor while noting it represented an evolutionary rather than revolutionary upgrade.

The camera won multiple industry awards in 2017. The Technical Image Press Association (TIPA) awarded it Best Full-Frame DSLR Expert in 2017. The European Imaging and Sound Association (EISA) named it Professional DSLR Camera 2017–2018, marking the third consecutive year Canon received this award. Imaging Resource selected the camera as Best Professional DSLR of 2016 and gave it a "Dave's Pick" recommendation.

Professional reviews consistently highlighted the camera's improved image quality and refined feature set. Digital Photography Review described the 5D Mark IV as "the most refined 5D yet," noting that while it was "an evolutionary update" rather than revolutionary, it offered "appreciably better quality (and at a faster rate) than its predecessor." The review praised the touchscreen interface, Dual Pixel CMOS AF system, built-in Wi-Fi and NFC, and noted significant improvements in dynamic range compared to the Mark III, particularly with "far less noisy shadow detail at lower ISO values." The publication concluded it was "a camera that will stand up to years of abuse and churn out images" and would "reward them with better and more reliable results than ever before."

Imaging Resource praised the camera's image quality, noting "top-notch hue and color accuracy, excellent high ISO performance, and displays much better dynamic range compared to the 5D Mark III." The review highlighted that the Dual Pixel CMOS AF system made focusing "easy and smooth" for video work.

However, some reviewers noted limitations in the camera's video capabilities. Digital Photography Review pointed out that the Motion JPEG codec for 4K video, 1080p-limited HDMI output, and 1.64x crop factor in 4K mode meant "anyone looking to shoot serious video is likely to be turned off." Reviewers also expressed concerns about the camera's limited customization options for controls.

== Upgrades ==
On 20 April 2017 Canon issued a press release, announcing the upcoming availability of a C-LOG upgrade for existing EOS 5D Mark IV cameras. Pricing was set at US$99 and cameras shipping with the feature upgrade pre-installed were announced for July 2017.

In early 2019 Canon released a Voice Tag upgrade for existing EOS 5D Mark IV cameras. Pricing was set at US$99.

== Firmware updates ==
Canon released several firmware updates for the EOS 5D Mark IV during its production run. The final firmware version was 1.4.0.

Firmware	Release date	Fixes and improvements
1.0.2	29 September 2016	Improved communication reliability when using EOS Utility to register/update new Digital Lens Optimizer.
1.0.3	29 November 2016	Corrected a phenomenon in which the color of images varies depending on the metering mode selected during flash shooting. Improved communication reliability when using EF1.4X III or EF2X III extenders. Corrected the level display when the camera is held in vertical orientation with the hand grip pointing downward. Improved reliability of communication via USB cable when using the Lens Data Registration function with EOS Utility 3.
1.1.2	3 April 2018	Added support for chromatic aberration, peripheral illumination, distortion corrections, and Digital Lens Optimizer for TS-E lenses. Fixed exposure issues during Silent Live View shooting with specific TS-E macro lenses. Added Exif 2.31 support. Resolved malfunction when using Camera Connect for high frame rate movie recording. Fixed Error 80 occurring during HDR movie Remote Live View Shooting on Canon Log-compatible cameras.
1.2.1	12 September 2019	Corrected a PTP communications vulnerability. Corrected a vulnerability related to firmware update.
1.3.0	20 October 2020	Enabled NFC connection with smartphones running Android 10 operating system. Added support for the .CR2 image file format on image.canon. Resolved an issue where some camera operations may not be possible or an error may occur after an insufficient flash output is produced when shooting with the flash.
1.3.1	TBD	Updated language displayed in the menu to improve readability.
1.3.2	27 May 2021	Improved the camera's connection compatibility to a PC while using a USB 3.0 or higher compatible cable. This firmware version was subsequently removed from Canon's servers until a minor bug could be fixed.
1.3.3	21 June 2021	Improved the camera's connectivity to a PC when using a USB 3.0 or higher compatible cable. Fixed an issue in which self-timer shooting cannot be performed (for cameras with Firmware Versions 1.3.1 and 1.3.2). Fixed an issue in which an electronic beep does not sound when registering an AF frame as the AF start position (for cameras with Firmware Versions 1.3.1 and 1.3.2). Fixed an issue in which a small sound is generated from the speaker when the power is turned on (for cameras with Firmware Version 1.3.2).
1.4.0	18 May 2023	Enhanced security for transferring captured images to image.canon. Users needed to update to this version by July 2023 to continue sending images to the service.

Type	Sensor	Class	00	01	02	03	04	05	06	07	08	09	10	11	12	13	14	15	16	17	18	19	20	21	22	23	24	25	26
DSLR	Full-frame	Flagship				1Ds		1Ds Mk II			1Ds Mk III					1D C													
DSLR	Full-frame	Flagship				1Ds		1Ds Mk II			1Ds Mk III				1D X					1D X Mk II ^{T}			1D X Mk III ^{T}						
DSLR	APS-H	Flagship			1D			1D Mk II	1D Mk II N		1D Mk III		1D Mk IV																
DSLR	Full-frame	Professional																	5DS / 5DS R										
DSLR	Full-frame	Professional							5D			_{x} 5D Mk II			_{x} 5D Mk III					5D Mk IV ^{T}									
DSLR	Full-frame	Advanced														_{x} 6D					_{x} 6D Mk II ^{AT}								
DSLR	APS-C	Advanced											_{x} 7D					_{x} 7D Mk II											
DSLR	APS-C	Mid-range						20Da								_{x} 60Da ^{A}													
DSLR	APS-C	Mid-range		D30	D60	10D		20D	30D		40D	_{x} 50D		_{x} 60D ^{A}			_{x} 70D ^{AT}		80D ^{AT}				90D ^{AT}						
DSLR	APS-C	Mid-range																	760D ^{AT}		77D ^{AT}								
DSLR	APS-C	Entry-level					300D	350D		400D	450D	_{x} 500D	_{x} 550D	_{x} 600D ^{A}		_{x} 650D ^{AT}	_{x} 700D ^{AT}		_{x} 750D ^{AT}		800D ^{AT}			850D ^{AT}					
DSLR	APS-C	Entry-level															_{x} 100D ^{T}		_{x} 200D ^{AT}				250D ^{AT}						
DSLR	APS-C	Entry-level										1000D		_{x} 1100D			_{x} 1200D			1300D		2000D							
DSLR	APS-C	Value																				4000D							
Early models			Canon EOS DCS 5 (1995); Canon EOS DCS 3 (1995); Canon EOS DCS 1 (1995); Canon EOS D2000 (1998); Canon EOS D6000 (1998)																										
Type	Sensor	Spec																											
Type	Sensor	Spec	00	01	02	03	04	05	06	07	08	09	10	11	12	13	14	15	16	17	18	19	20	21	22	23	24	25	26
