= Wide-angle lens =

Type of lens

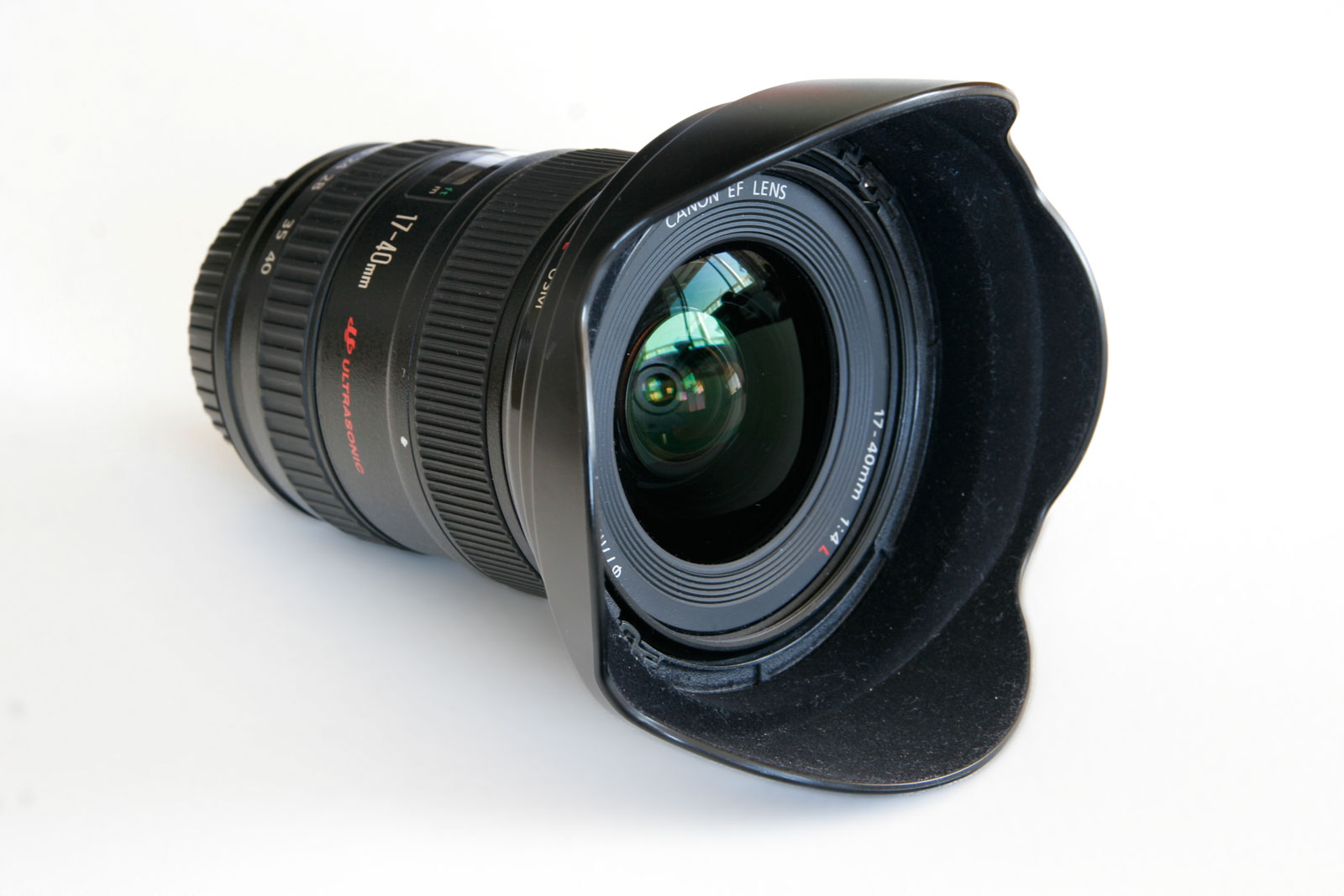
A Canon wide-angle 17-40 mm f/4 L retrofocus zoom lens

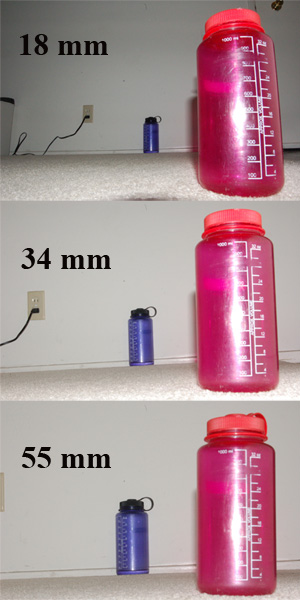
How focal length affects photograph composition. Three images depict the same two objects, kept in the same positions. By changing the focal length and adjusting the camera's distance from the pink bottle, this bottle remains the same size in the image, while the blue bottle's size appears to dramatically change. Also note that at small focal lengths, more of the scene is included.

In photography and cinematography, a wide-angle lens is a lens covering a large angle of view. (Note: An angle of view between about 63° and 84°, which corresponds to focal lengths of 35 to 24 mm in the 35 mm film format.) Conversely, its focal length is substantially smaller than that of a normal lens for a given film plane. This type of lens allows more of the scene to be included in the photograph, which is useful in architectural, interior, and landscape photography where the photographer may not be able to move farther from the scene to photograph it.

Another use is where the photographer wishes to emphasize the difference in size or distance between objects in the foreground and the background; nearby objects appear very large and objects at a moderate distance appear small and far away.

This exaggeration of relative size can be used to make foreground objects more prominent and striking, while capturing expansive backgrounds.

A wide-angle lens is also one that projects a substantially larger image circle than would be typical for a standard design lens of the same focal length. This large image circle allows large tilt and shift movements with a view camera.

By convention, in still photography, the normal lens for a particular format has a focal length approximately equal to the length of the diagonal of the image frame or digital photosensor. In cinematography, a lens of roughly twice the diagonal is considered "normal".

== Characteristics ==
Longer lenses magnify the subject more, apparently compressing distance and (when focused on the foreground) blurring the background because of their shallower depth of field. Wider lenses tend to magnify the distance between objects while allowing greater depth of field.

Another result of using a wide-angle lens is a greater apparent perspective distortion when the camera is not aligned perpendicularly to the subject: parallel lines converge at the same rate as with a normal lens but converge more due to the wider total field. For example, buildings appear to be falling backward much more severely when the camera is pointed upward from ground level than they would if photographed with a normal lens at the same distance from the subject because more of the subject building is visible in the wide-angle shot.

Because different lenses generally require a different camera–subject distance to preserve the size of a subject, changing the angle of view can indirectly distort perspective, changing the apparent relative size of the subject and foreground.

== Wide-angle lenses for 35 mm format ==
For a full-frame 35 mm camera with a 36 mm by 24 mm format, the diagonal measures 43.3 mm, and by custom, the normal lens adopted by most manufacturers is 50 mm. Also by custom, a lens of focal length 35 mm or less is considered wide-angle.

Ultra wide angle lenses have a focal length shorter than the short side of the film or sensor. In 35 mm, an ultra wide-angle lens has a focal length shorter than 24 mm.

Common wide-angle lenses for a full-frame 35 mm camera are 35, 28, 24, 21, 20, 18, and 14 mm, the latter four being ultra-wide. Many of the lenses in this range will produce a more or less rectilinear image at the film plane, though some degree of barrel distortion is not uncommon.

Ultra wide-angle lenses that do not produce a rectilinear image (i.e., exhibit barrel distortion) are called fisheye lenses. Common focal lengths for these in a 35 mm camera are 6 to 8 mm (which produce a circular image). Lenses with focal lengths of 8 to 16 mm may be either rectilinear or fisheye designs.

Wide-angle lenses come in both fixed-focal-length and zoom varieties. For 35 mm cameras, rectilinear lenses are made with focal lengths below 12 mm. In 2020 Venus Optics introduced the Laowa 9mm f/5.6 FF RL, announced as the widest rectilinear lens for full-frame cameras, with a 135° angle of view; the company's 10–18 mm f/4.5–5.6 was then the widest full-frame zoom lens.

== Digital camera considerations ==
Field of view in APS-sized digital cameras is the same as that of a longer lens, increased by crop factor, on a full-frame 35 mm format camera.

As of 2015, many interchangeable-lens digital cameras have image sensors that are smaller than the film format of full-frame 35 mm cameras. (Note: The few exceptions include the Canon EOS-1D X, EOS 5DS/5DS R, EOS 5D Mark III and EOS 6D; Nikon's D4S, Df, D810, D750 and D610; and Sony's α99 and α7 family. Discontinued full-frame cameras include the Canon EOS-1Ds, Canon EOS-1Ds Mark II, Canon EOS-1Ds Mark III, EOS 5D, EOS 5D Mark II, Nikon D4, Nikon D3, Nikon D800, Nikon D700, Nikon D600, Contax N Digital, Sony Alpha 900, Sony Alpha 850, Kodak DCS Pro SLR/c and Kodak DCS Pro SLR/n.) For the most part, the dimensions of these image sensors are similar to the APS-C image frame size, i.e., approximately 24 mm x 16 mm. Therefore, the angle of view for any given focal-length lens will be narrower than it would be in a full-frame camera because the smaller sensor "sees" less of the image projected by the lens. The camera manufacturers provide a crop factor (sometimes called a field-of-view factor or a focal-length multiplier) to show how much smaller the sensor is than a full 35 mm film frame. For example, one common factor is 1.5 (Nikon DX format and some others), although many cameras have crop factors of 1.6 (most Canon DSLRs), 1.7 (the early Sigma DSLRs) and 2 (the Four Thirds and Micro Four Thirds cameras). The 1.5 indicates that the angle of view of a lens on the camera is the same as that of a 1.5 times longer focal length on a 35 mm full-frame camera, which explains why the crop factor is also known as a focal-length multiplier. For example, a 28 mm lens on the DSLR (given a crop factor of 1.5) would produce the angle of view of a 42 mm lens on a full-frame camera. So, to determine the focal length of a lens for a digital camera that will give the equivalent angle of view as one on a full-frame camera, the full-frame lens focal length must be divided by the crop factor. For example, to get the equivalent angle of view of a 30 mm lens on a full-frame 35 mm camera, from a digital camera with a 1.5 crop factor, one would use a 20 mm lens.

Lens manufacturers have responded by making wide-angle lenses of much shorter focal lengths for these cameras. In doing this, they limit the diameter of the image projected to slightly more than the diagonal measurement of the photosensor. This gives the designers more flexibility in providing the optical corrections necessary to economically produce high-quality images at these short focal lengths, especially when the lenses are zoom lenses. Examples are 10 mm minimum focal length zoom lenses from several manufacturers. At 10 mm, these lenses provide the angle of view of a 15 mm lens on a full-frame camera when the crop factor is 1.5.

== Construction ==
Cross-section of a typical short-focus wide-angle lens.

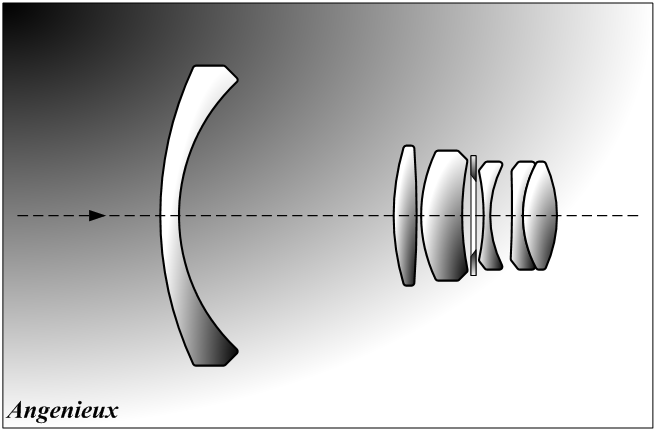
Cross-section of a typical retrofocus wide-angle lens.

There are two varieties of wide-angle lens: short-focus lenses and retrofocus lenses. Short-focus lenses are generally made up of multiple glass elements whose shapes are more or less symmetrical in front of and behind the diaphragm. As the focal length decreases, the distance of the rear element of the lens from the film plane or digital sensor also decreases.

This makes short-focus wide-angle lenses undesirable for single-lens reflex cameras unless they are used with the reflex mirrors locked up. On large format view cameras and rangefinder cameras, short-focus lenses are widely used because they give less distortion than the retrofocus design and there is no need for a long back focal distance.

Effective focal length is measured from the sensor to where the light cone going to the sensor is the same size as the lens front opening.

The retrofocus lens solves this proximity problem through an asymmetrical design that allows the rear element to be farther away from the film plane than its effective focal length would suggest. (See Angénieux retrofocus.)

For example, it is not uncommon for the rear element of a retrofocus lens of 18 mm to be more than 25 mm from the film plane. This makes it possible to design wide-angle lenses for single-lens reflex cameras.

The axial adjustment range for focusing Ultra wide angle lenses and some Wide-angle lenses in large format cameras is usually very small. Some manufacturers (e.g. Linhof) have offered special focusing lens mounts, so-called 'wide-angle focusing devices' for their cameras that allow the lens to be focused precisely without moving the entire front standard.

== Development ==
The earliest panoramic wide-angle lens was designed by the photographer Thomas Sutton, who patented it on 28 September 1859. It was a hollow sphere of flint glass filled with distilled water and divided into two compartments by a brass diaphragm, and it produced panoramic images without the use of a rotating body. Cameras for the lens, with a curved back taking curved glass wet plates, were made by Thomas Ross of London around 1861.

== See also ==
- Anamorphic lens
- Image stitching
- Long focus lens
- Panomorph
- Panoramic photography
- Photographic lens design
- Scioptric ball
- Telephoto lens
- Virtual-reality photography
