= Canon EOS 5D =

2005 full-frame digital single-lens reflex camera

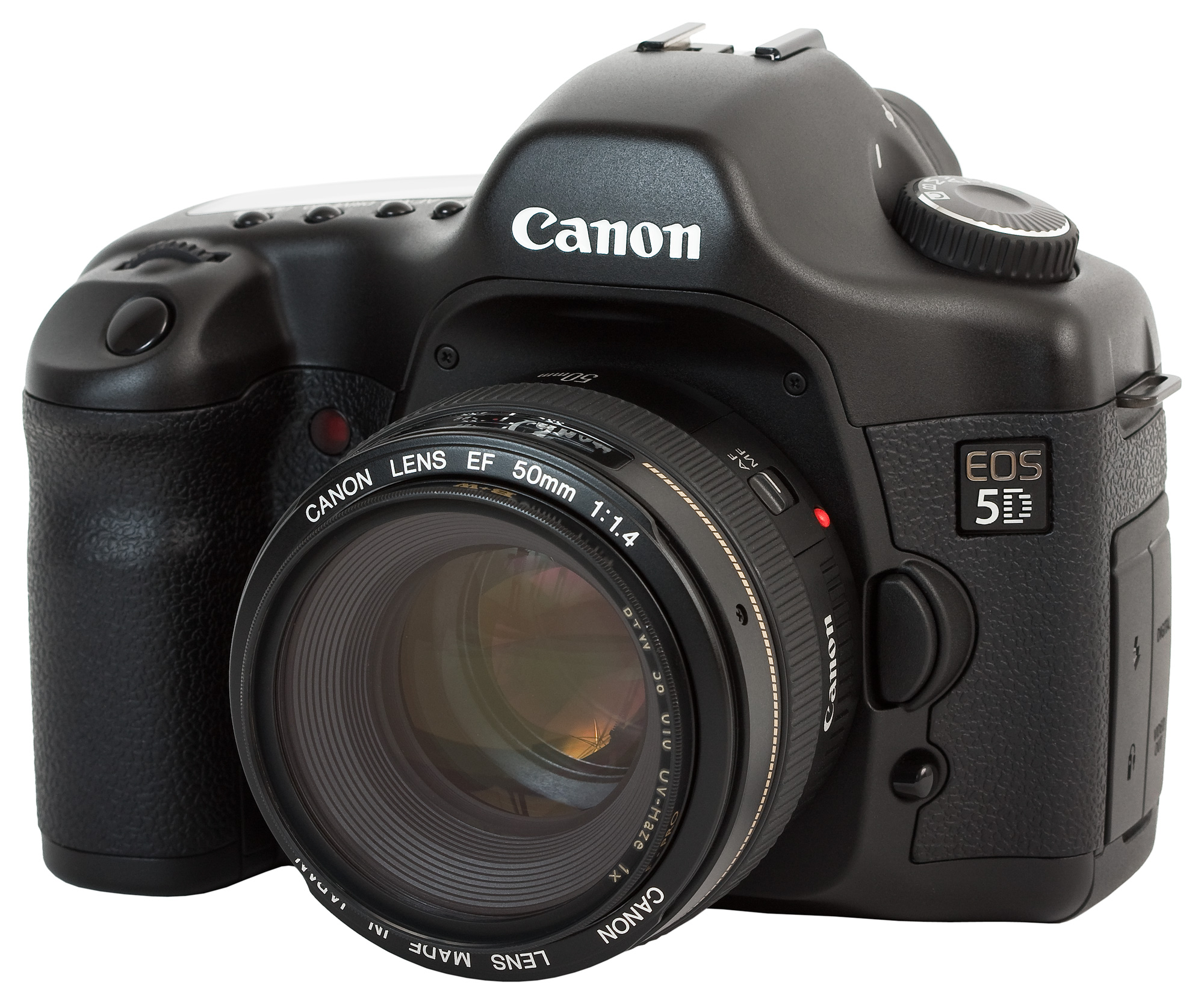

Overview
- Maker: Canon Inc.
- Type: Digital single-lens reflex
- Released: October 2005

Lens
- Lens mount: Canon EF
- Lens: Interchangeable

Sensor/medium
- Sensor: 35.8 x 23.9 mm CMOS (full-frame)
- Maximum resolution: 4,368 × 2,912 (12.7 effective megapixels)
- Film speed: 100-1600 expandable to 50 (L) and 3200 (H)
- Storage media: CompactFlash (CF) (Type I or Type II)

Focusing
- Focus modes: One-shot, AI Servo, AI-Focus, Manual
- Focus areas: 9 user points + 6 assist points

Exposure/metering
- Exposure modes: Full auto, programmed, shutter-priority, aperture priority, manual
- Exposure metering: TTL, full aperture, 35 zones
- Metering modes: Evaluative,, Spot, C/Wgt Average

Shutter
- Shutter: electronic focal-plane
- Shutter speed range: 30 to 1/8000 s and Bulb
- Continuous shooting: up to 3 frame/s.

Viewfinder
- Viewfinder: Optical, pentaprism
- Image processor: DIGIC 2

General
- LCD screen: 2.5 in (64 mm), 230,000 pixels
- Battery: Li-Ion BP-511A Rechargeable
- Optional battery packs: BP-511A, BP-514, BP-511, BP-512. BG-E4 grip allows use of AA cells.
- Dimensions: 152×113×75 mm (6.0×4.4×3.0 in)
- Weight: 810 g (29 oz) (body only)
- Made in: Japan

Chronology
- Successor: Canon EOS 5D Mark II

The Canon EOS 5D is a 12.7 megapixel full-frame digital single-lens reflex (DSLR) camera body produced by Canon. Announced on 22 August 2005, the EOS 5D was the first full-frame DSLR camera with a standard body size, as opposed to the taller, double-grip "professional" camera body style of previous full-frame models. At a suggested retail price of US$3,299, the camera set a significant new low price point for full-frame DSLRs and made the format accessible to enthusiast photographers; its only full-frame competition at the time was the Canon 1Ds Mark II, which cost more than twice as much. The camera accepts EF lens mount lenses.

The EOS 5D received widespread critical acclaim and won multiple industry awards, including the Technical Image Press Association (TIPA) Best D-SLR Professional award in 2006 and the European Imaging and Sound Association (EISA) European Professional Camera award for 2006–2007. Reviewers praised the camera's image quality, full-frame sensor performance, and value proposition, with Digital Photography Review giving it a "Highly Recommended" verdict.

Canon announced the camera's successor, the Canon EOS 5D Mark II, on 17 September 2008. Despite being discontinued, the original 5D has experienced a resurgence of interest in the late 2010s and 2020s as a "digital classic," with photographers appreciating its distinctive image rendering characteristics and sensor qualities that have been compared to film.

== Features ==
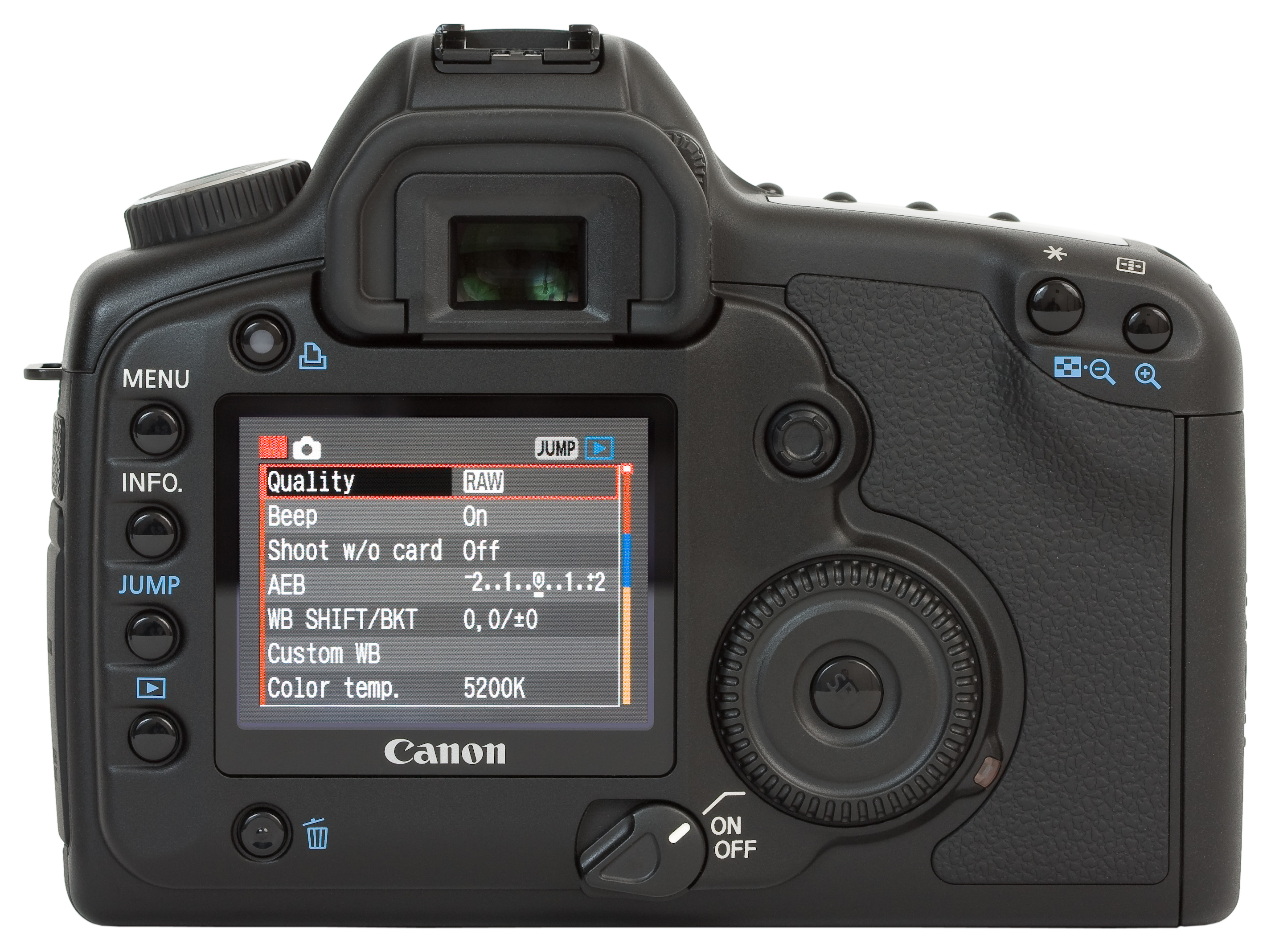
Back of the Canon EOS 5D camera

Key features of the EOS 5D include:

- DIGIC II image processor
- 35.8 x 23.9 mm full-frame CMOS sensor with 13.3 million pixels (12.7 megapixel effective) and a pixel density of 1.5 megapixels per square centimetre
- ISO speeds from 100 to 1600, adjustable in 1/3 steps (expandable to L: 50 or H: 3200 with a menu function). The ISO 50 setting reduces dynamic range by a stop in the highlights
- Nine autofocus points (plus six "invisible assist AF points" available only during continuous-focus tracking) arranged in a horizontal diamond pattern
- TTL 35-zone SPC metering with four variations (evaluative, center-weighted, partial, spot) and exposure compensation of −2 EV to +2 EV in steps of 1/3 EV. E-TTL II flash metering is provided
- Electronic focal-plane shutter rated to 100,000 shots, capable of speeds up to 1/8000 sec, with a flash sync speed of 1/200 sec
- Pentaprism viewfinder with approx. 96% coverage (borrowed from the 1D range, omitting the pop-up flash of the consumer range)
- Introduced new Ee interchangeable focusing screen system, with the standard Ee-A focusing screen, as well as precision Ee-S and Ee-D screens available in the past
- 2.5 in (64 mm) colour TFT liquid-crystal monitor with 230,000 pixels
- Continuous shooting at up to 3 frames per second, with a buffer that can store up to 60 frames in large JPEG mode, and up to 17 frames in RAW
- Dimensions: 152×113×75 mm (6.0×4.4×3.0 in) (body only); Weight: 895 g (body only w/battery)
- First prosumer Canon DSLR to store 9,999 images in one folder (a feature previously exclusive to the EOS-1D series), compared to 100 images on predecessors
- Bundled software includes Digital Photo Professional, ZoomBrowser EX / ImageBrowser, PhotoStitch, EOS Utility, and Picture Style Editor

== Reception ==
The Canon EOS 5D received widespread critical acclaim and industry recognition, particularly for making full-frame digital photography accessible at an unprecedented price point. The camera won multiple prestigious industry awards, including the Technical Image Press Association (TIPA) Best D-SLR Professional award in 2006 and the European Imaging and Sound Association (EISA) European Professional Camera award for 2006–2007. TIPA praised the camera as "the first digital camera that offers a full-frame, 24x36mm sensor at a realistic price" with "12.8 million pixels available" providing "plenty of resolution for huge prints." The judges highlighted that the large pixel size resulted in "lower noise and higher quality in the final image" and that the full-frame sensor meant "the actual focal lengths of Canon EF lenses are used" without a crop factor.

Professional reviews consistently praised the camera's image quality and value proposition. Digital Photography Review described the EOS 5D as "a fantastic photographic tool which is capable of producing really excellent results," noting that "resolution is absolutely excellent with crisp detailed results straight from the camera (JPEG) and even more detail available if you shoot RAW." The review concluded that for anyone seeking a Canon full-frame digital SLR, the choice was between the $3,299 EOS 5D or the $7,999 EOS-1Ds Mark II, and that "to anyone looking for the 'purity' of full frame (and a Canon mount) the EOS 5D would be absolutely Highly Recommended."

Imaging Resource published a guest review by photographer Sean Reid, who concluded that "all things considered, this is the best DSLR, for my own work, that I have ever used." Reid noted that "in many respects, the Canon 5D is exactly the camera that many photographers have been asking for" with "a full frame sensor, high resolution and a fairly light/compact body," and that "it probably has the best price/performance ratio of any Canon DSLR introduced so far." He also observed that the "drawing" and tonality of files from the 5D resembled medium format film.

The camera's introduction was met with what Digital Photography Review described as "a fairly rapturous reception among existing Canon owners" as well as varied reactions from other brand owners. The review noted that the EOS 5D effectively established two camps in the photography community: the "Full Frame or nothing" group and the "Cropped is better" group. While the camera's noise levels and dynamic range were found to be essentially identical to the EOS 20D, this was attributed to consistency in Canon's CMOS sensor performance rather than viewed as a limitation.

== Contemporary use ==
Despite being released in 2005, the EOS 5D has experienced a resurgence of interest among photographers in the late 2010s and 2020s as a "digital classic" or "vintage digital" camera. The camera's full-frame sensor and distinctive image rendering characteristics have attracted photographers seeking an affordable entry into full-frame photography or those who appreciate its particular aesthetic qualities.

Amateur Photographer featured the camera in its "Second-hand classic" series, noting that while the 5D originally cost around $3,299 / £2,500 at launch, second-hand examples in good condition could be sourced for significantly less, with some users reporting purchases for as little as £230. The magazine highlighted user praise for the camera's image quality, particularly its "depth and range of colour" suitable for large prints.

In a 2018 retrospective review published on photographer Ming Thein's blog, reviewer Robin Wong assessed the camera as "an OK camera with a great sensor," emphasizing that the sensor's rendering qualities resembled film. Contemporary users have particularly praised the camera's sensor characteristics and color rendering, with some noting that its full-frame 12.8-megapixel sensor continues to deliver "great image quality at lower ISO settings that still holds up quite well today."

The EOS 5D is compatible with early versions of Magic Lantern, an open-source firmware add-on that extends the capabilities of Canon DSLR cameras. While Magic Lantern development was primarily focused on later models such as the 5D Mark II, the original 5D received support in older versions of the firmware, adding features such as enhanced controls and additional functionality for both stills and video shooting.

== Firmware updates ==
Canon released several firmware updates for the EOS 5D during its production run. The final firmware version was 1.1.1, though Canon no longer provides firmware downloads for this discontinued model.

Firmware	Fixes and improvements
1.1.0	Enhancement of direct printing with specific printers. Correction of communication errors that occurred when shooting with EOS 5D and EOS Capture software after approximately 138 shots. Correction of flash mode settings changing from E-TTL to Manual when used with Speedlite Transmitter ST-E2 and Speedlite 580EX.
1.1.1	Fixed an issue where CF cards of 8GB or greater could not be correctly detected even after initializing the card, allowing the camera to correctly recognize high-capacity CF cards. Added support for recording the latest lens names in the Exif information of images taken.

== See also ==
- Kodak DCS Pro SLR/c, an earlier Canon EF-compatible full-frame digital SLR

Type	Sensor	Class	00	01	02	03	04	05	06	07	08	09	10	11	12	13	14	15	16	17	18	19	20	21	22	23	24	25	26
DSLR	Full-frame	Flagship				1Ds		1Ds Mk II			1Ds Mk III					1D C													
DSLR	Full-frame	Flagship				1Ds		1Ds Mk II			1Ds Mk III				1D X					1D X Mk II ^{T}			1D X Mk III ^{T}						
DSLR	APS-H	Flagship			1D			1D Mk II	1D Mk II N		1D Mk III		1D Mk IV																
DSLR	Full-frame	Professional																	5DS / 5DS R										
DSLR	Full-frame	Professional							5D			_{x} 5D Mk II			_{x} 5D Mk III					5D Mk IV ^{T}									
DSLR	Full-frame	Advanced														_{x} 6D					_{x} 6D Mk II ^{AT}								
DSLR	APS-C	Advanced											_{x} 7D					_{x} 7D Mk II											
DSLR	APS-C	Mid-range						20Da								_{x} 60Da ^{A}													
DSLR	APS-C	Mid-range		D30	D60	10D		20D	30D		40D	_{x} 50D		_{x} 60D ^{A}			_{x} 70D ^{AT}		80D ^{AT}				90D ^{AT}						
DSLR	APS-C	Mid-range																	760D ^{AT}		77D ^{AT}								
DSLR	APS-C	Entry-level					300D	350D		400D	450D	_{x} 500D	_{x} 550D	_{x} 600D ^{A}		_{x} 650D ^{AT}	_{x} 700D ^{AT}		_{x} 750D ^{AT}		800D ^{AT}			850D ^{AT}					
DSLR	APS-C	Entry-level															_{x} 100D ^{T}		_{x} 200D ^{AT}				250D ^{AT}						
DSLR	APS-C	Entry-level										1000D		_{x} 1100D			_{x} 1200D			1300D		2000D							
DSLR	APS-C	Value																				4000D							
Early models			Canon EOS DCS 5 (1995); Canon EOS DCS 3 (1995); Canon EOS DCS 1 (1995); Canon EOS D2000 (1998); Canon EOS D6000 (1998)																										
Type	Sensor	Spec																											
Type	Sensor	Spec	00	01	02	03	04	05	06	07	08	09	10	11	12	13	14	15	16	17	18	19	20	21	22	23	24	25	26
