= Canon EOS 7D =

2009 APS-C digital single-lens reflex camera

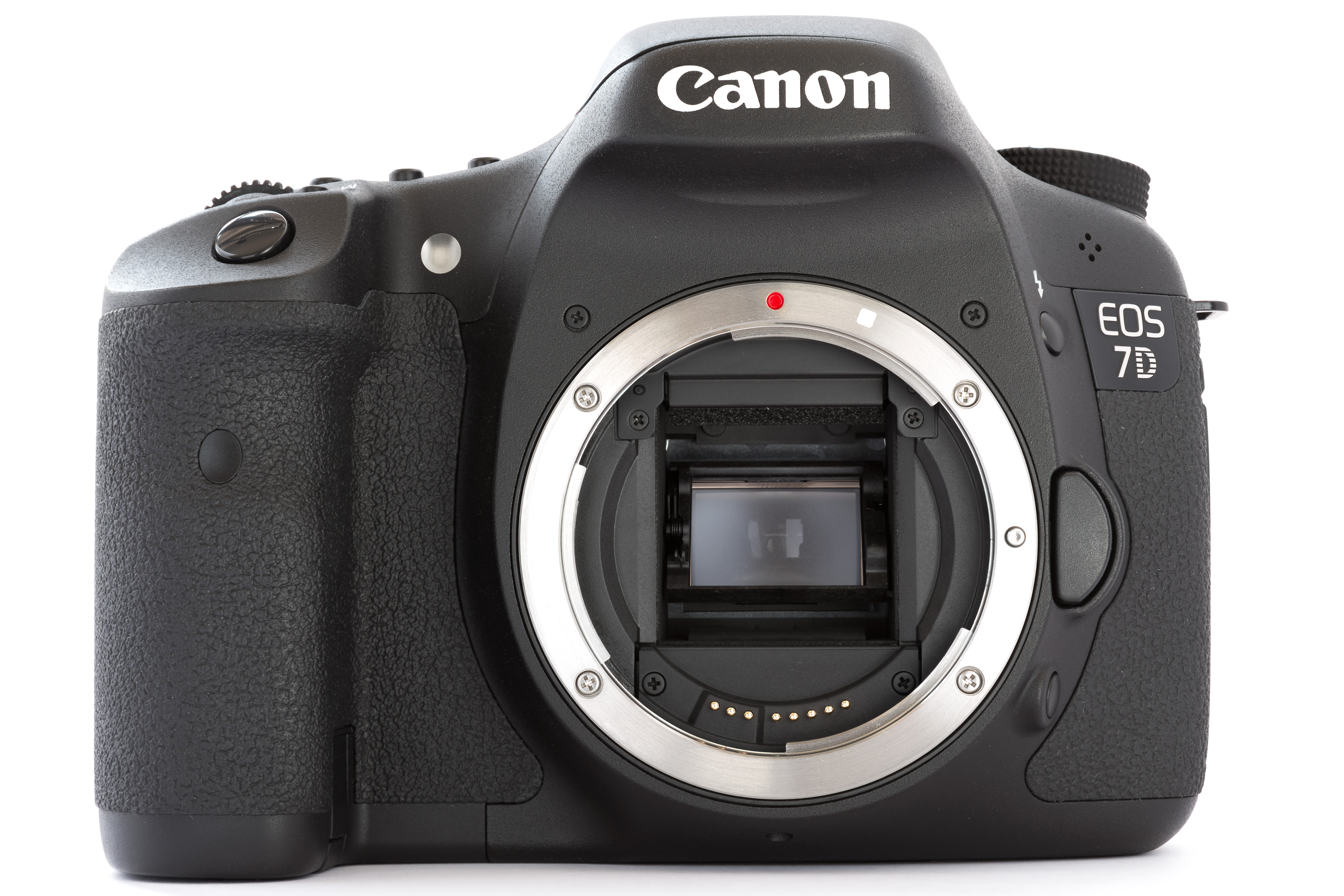

Overview
- Maker: Canon Inc.
- Type: Digital single-lens reflex camera
- Intro price: $1699.00

Lens
- Lens mount: Canon EF-S
- Lens: Interchangeable

Sensor/medium
- Sensor: 22.3 × 14.9 mm CMOS
- Maximum resolution: 5,184 × 3,456 (18 effective megapixels)
- Film speed: 100–6400 (expansion up to 12,800)
- Storage media: CompactFlash (CF) (Type I or Type II)

Focusing
- Focus modes: One-shot, AI Servo, AI Focus, Manual
- Focus areas: 19 cross-type AF points

Exposure/metering
- Exposure modes: Full auto, programmed, shutter priority, aperture priority, manual
- Exposure metering: TTL, full aperture, 63 zones
- Metering modes: Evaluative, Partial, Spot, C/Wgt Average

Shutter
- Shutter: Electronic focal-plane
- Shutter speed range: 30s to 1/8000 s Bulb
- Continuous shooting: up to 8.0 frame/s

Viewfinder
- Viewfinder: Optical pentaprism with 1.0x magnification (with 50mm lens) and 100% coverage and electronic (Live View)
- Image processor: DIGIC 4

General
- LCD screen: 3.0 inches (76 mm), 640×480 (921,600 dots)
- Battery: Li-Ion LP-E6 Rechargeable (1800mAh)
- Optional battery packs: BG-E7 grip allows use of 6 AA cells, a single LP-E6 or two LP-E6 batteries
- Weight: 820 g (29 oz) (body only)
- Made in: Japan

Chronology
- Successor: Canon EOS 7D Mark II

The Canon EOS 7D is a high-end APS-C digital single-lens reflex camera made by Canon. It was announced on 1 September 2009 with a suggested retail price of US$1,699, and was marketed as a semi-professional DSLR camera.

Among its features are an 18.0 effective megapixel CMOS sensor, Full HD video recording, its 8.0 frames per second continuous shooting, new viewfinder which offers 1.0X magnification and 100% coverage, 19-point auto-focus system, movie mode, and built-in Speedlite transmitter.

The EOS 7D remained in Canon's single-digit APS-C model lineup without replacement for slightly more than five years—the longest product cycle for any EOS digital camera. Its successor was the Canon EOS 7D Mark II, announced on 15 September 2014.

== Features ==
- 18.0 effective megapixel APS-C CMOS sensor
- Dual DIGIC 4 image processors with 14-bit processing
- Liveview mode
- 100% viewfinder frame coverage with 1.0× magnification
- 1080p HD video recording at 24p, 25p and 30p with drop frame timing
- 720p HD video recording at 50p (50 Hz) and 60p (59.94 Hz)
- 480p ED video recording at 50p (50 Hz) and 60p (59.94 Hz)
- 8.0 frames per second continuous shooting
- ISO sensitivity 100–6400 (expandable to 12,800)
- 3.0-inch Clear View II LCD screen with 640 × 480 (921,600 dots) resolution
- 19-point auto-focus system, all cross-type. Center point is high precision, double cross-type at f/2.8 or faster
- 63-zone color sensitive metering system
- built-in Speedlite transmitter
- Magnesium alloy body
- Popup flash
- Weather sealing (light resistance to water and dust)

=== Autofocus and metering ===
The 7D has 19 autofocus points arranged in a horizontal diamond pattern. The AF system is a new design which uses a translucent LCD in the viewfinder. The camera uses TTL 63-zone color sensitive metering system with four variations (evaluative, center-weighted, partial, spot) and exposure compensation of −5 EV to +5 EV in steps of 1/3 EV (±3 EV visible in the viewfinder and top screen, ±5 EV visible on the back screen). E-TTL II flash metering is provided.

The translucent LCD can also display guide lines and the spot metering area circle. As with most other video-capable DSLRs, the Canon EOS 7D's autofocusing function does not work while recording video. Instead, users can only trigger a contrast-detect AF cycle before recording process by hitting the AF button on the camera's rear panel. Users can manually focus the lens during a recording.

=== Shutter ===
The shutter is rated to 150,000 shots, and is capable of speeds up to 1/8000 sec, with a flash sync speed of 1/250 sec.

=== Ergonomics ===
The 7D has roughly the same dimension as the older 5D Mark II with an updated button layout. It also features a 100% viewfinder with 1x magnification (equivalent in size to a 0.62x full frame viewfinder).

The 7D was the first Canon camera with a dedicated movie mode switch, instead of movie recording being done in live view as with the 5D Mark II and 500D.

=== Speed ===
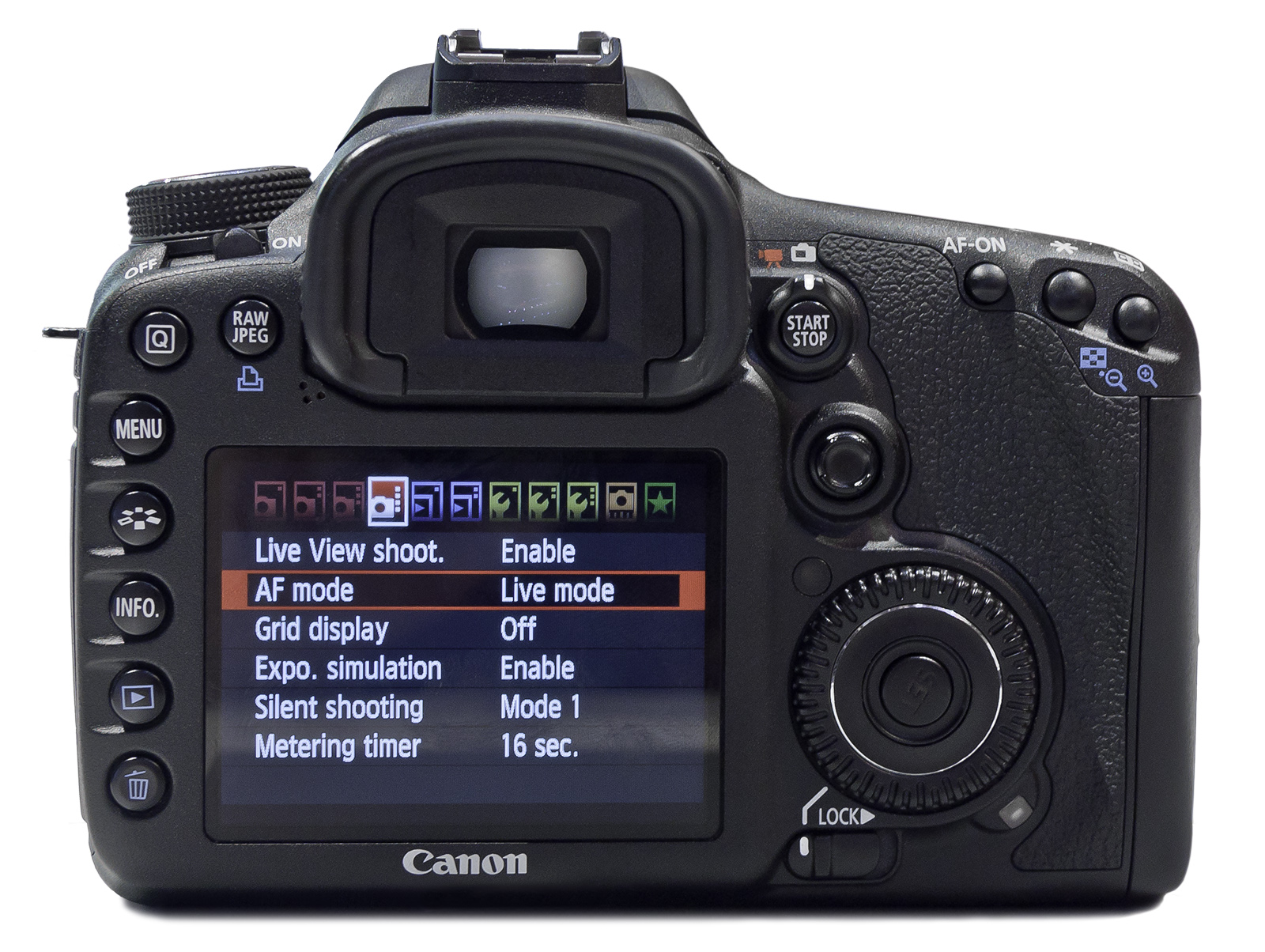
Rear view.

The 7D has dual DIGIC 4 processors and can reach 8 frames per second continuous shooting. When the camera was first released, the buffer throughput allowed up to 94 frames in large fine JPEG mode, and up to 15 frames in raw. Firmware upgrades, most recently in August 2012 (see immediately below), have increased the maximum buffer size to 130 large fine JPEGs and 25 raw files.

=== Firmware updates ===
On 6 August 2012, new firmware v2.0 was released with the following enhancements:

- Improved maximum burst for raw images (up to 25)
- In-camera raw image editing
- In-camera Image Rating
- In-camera JPEG resizing
- Maximum Auto ISO setting (ISO 400–6400)
- Manual audio level adjustment in movie recording
- Support for the Canon GP-E2 GPS unit
- File name customisation
- Time zone settings
- Faster scrolling of magnified images
- Quick control screen during playback

On 12 September 2012, Canon introduced the v2.0.3 firmware update with the following changes:

- Fix for a phenomenon in which the camera stops working when the auto power off setting takes effect
- Fix a phenomenon in which the maximum number of images that can be captured in a burst may be less than the actual number displayed in the viewfinder
- Corrections for some errors in the message displayed when saving raw images developed in the camera

On 2 December 2013, Canon introduced the v2.0.5 firmware update with the following changes:

- Fixes a phenomenon in which the image files cannot be transferred using the FTP protocol via USB cable after the Canon EOS 7D camera has established a wireless connection to the Wireless File Transmitter WFT-E5A.

On 13 December 2016, Canon introduced the v2.0.6 firmware update with the following changes:

- Corrects a phenomenon in which when using the camera with the EF-S 18-135mm f/3.5-5.6 IS USM or EF 70-300mm f/4-5.6 IS II USM lens, even if lens aberration correction is set to ""Enable"", correction will not be applied.

== Accessories ==
According to Canon's website, the EOS 7D model comes equipped with:

- EOS 7D Digital SLR Body
- Eyecup E.g.
- Camera Cover R-F-3
- Wide Strap EW-EOS7D
- Battery Charger LC-E6
- Battery Pack LP-E6
- Stereo AV Cable AV-DC400ST
- Interface Cable IFC-200U

== Awards ==
The Canon EOS 7D won the 2010–2011 European Advanced SLR Camera and the Technical Image Press Association Best DSLR Expert awards.

== Video ==
The Canon EOS 7D offers the ability to record audio from an external source. Both shutter and aperture are available for manual control, and the 7D also provides multiple frame rate options, including three that match the HD television timing specs. Like most DSLR models, the Canon 7D neglects endless autofocus during video recording, which is a great concern for advanced amateurs with pros likely to focus manually nonetheless.

Separate movie clips that are captured by the Canon EOS 7D are limited to twelve minutes in the high definition 1080p and 720p modes, or 24 minutes in the standard definition VGA mode, depending on what Compact Flash Card is being used. Larger memory cards make for longer video lengths and are available in multiple sizes for the camera.

Independent filmmakers often use the Canon 7D as an affordable alternative to digital cinema cameras. The camera was used on the feature films Stanley Ka Dabba, Vazhakku Enn 18/9, and The Avengers. They have also been used on television in the opening title sequence of the 2009 season of Saturday Night Live.

Like Crazy and Tiny Furniture were filmed using the 7D.

Type	Sensor	Class	00	01	02	03	04	05	06	07	08	09	10	11	12	13	14	15	16	17	18	19	20	21	22	23	24	25	26
DSLR	Full-frame	Flagship				1Ds		1Ds Mk II			1Ds Mk III					1D C													
DSLR	Full-frame	Flagship				1Ds		1Ds Mk II			1Ds Mk III				1D X					1D X Mk II ^{T}			1D X Mk III ^{T}						
DSLR	APS-H	Flagship			1D			1D Mk II	1D Mk II N		1D Mk III		1D Mk IV																
DSLR	Full-frame	Professional																	5DS / 5DS R										
DSLR	Full-frame	Professional							5D			_{x} 5D Mk II			_{x} 5D Mk III					5D Mk IV ^{T}									
DSLR	Full-frame	Advanced														_{x} 6D					_{x} 6D Mk II ^{AT}								
DSLR	APS-C	Advanced											_{x} 7D					_{x} 7D Mk II											
DSLR	APS-C	Mid-range						20Da								_{x} 60Da ^{A}													
DSLR	APS-C	Mid-range		D30	D60	10D		20D	30D		40D	_{x} 50D		_{x} 60D ^{A}			_{x} 70D ^{AT}		80D ^{AT}				90D ^{AT}						
DSLR	APS-C	Mid-range																	760D ^{AT}		77D ^{AT}								
DSLR	APS-C	Entry-level					300D	350D		400D	450D	_{x} 500D	_{x} 550D	_{x} 600D ^{A}		_{x} 650D ^{AT}	_{x} 700D ^{AT}		_{x} 750D ^{AT}		800D ^{AT}			850D ^{AT}					
DSLR	APS-C	Entry-level															_{x} 100D ^{T}		_{x} 200D ^{AT}				250D ^{AT}						
DSLR	APS-C	Entry-level										1000D		_{x} 1100D			_{x} 1200D			1300D		2000D							
DSLR	APS-C	Value																				4000D							
Early models			Canon EOS DCS 5 (1995); Canon EOS DCS 3 (1995); Canon EOS DCS 1 (1995); Canon EOS D2000 (1998); Canon EOS D6000 (1998)																										
Type	Sensor	Spec																											
Type	Sensor	Spec	00	01	02	03	04	05	06	07	08	09	10	11	12	13	14	15	16	17	18	19	20	21	22	23	24	25	26
