= Canon EOS 5D Mark III =

2012 full-frame digital single-lens reflex camera

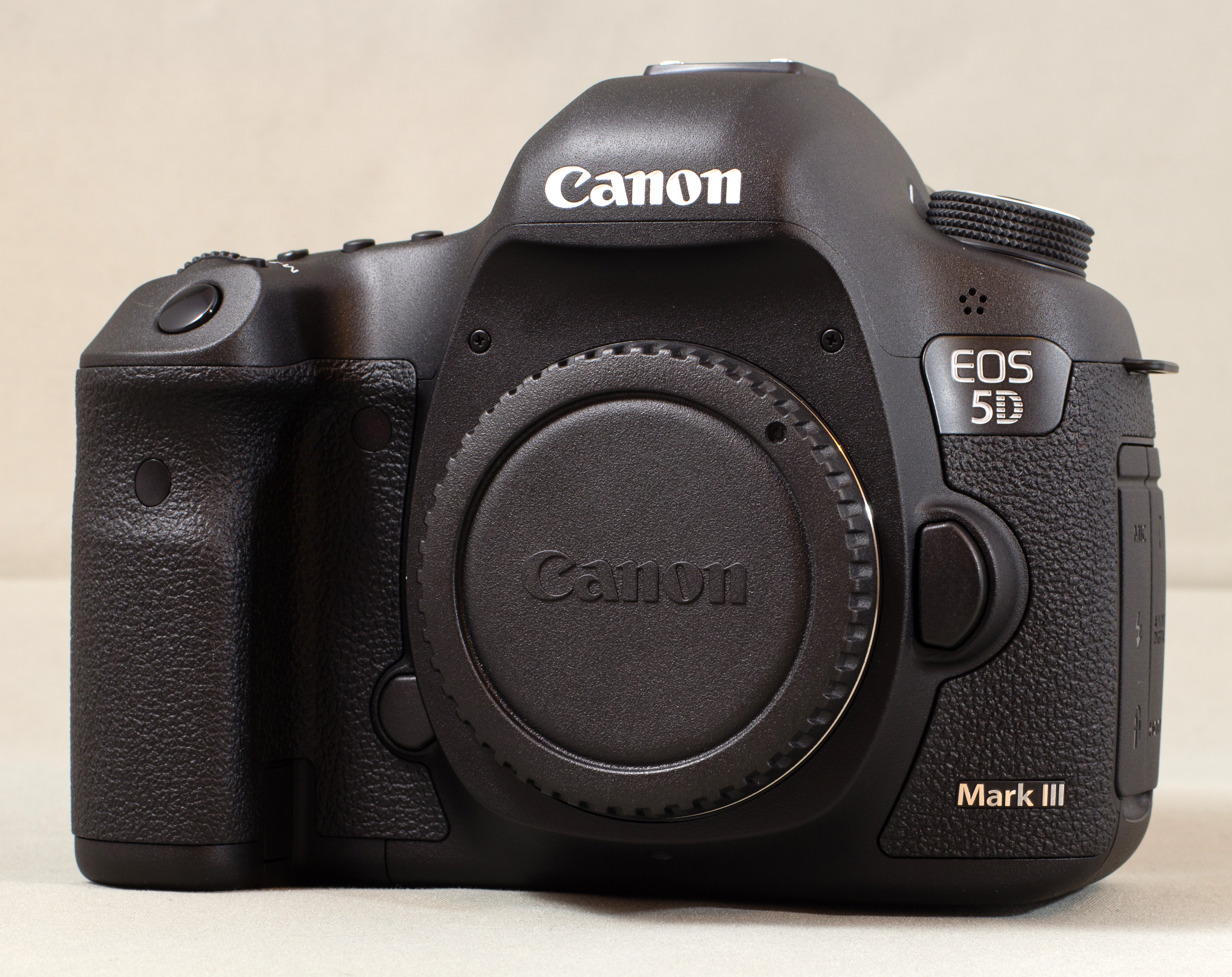

Overview
- Maker: Canon Inc.
- Type: Digital single-lens reflex camera
- Released: March 2012
- Intro price: US$ 3499.00

Lens
- Lens mount: Canon EF
- Lens: Interchangeable

Sensor/medium
- Sensor type: CMOS
- Sensor size: 36 × 24 mm (Full-frame)
- Maximum resolution: 5760 × 3840 (22.3 effective megapixels)
- Film speed: 100 – 25600 in 1/3 stops increments/decrements (expandable from L: 50 to H1: 51200; H2: 102400)
- Storage media: Dual slots: CompactFlash (CF) card Type I (UDMA-7 supported) and SD/SDHC/SDXC card

Focusing
- Focus modes: One-Shot, AI Focus, AI Servo, Live View (FlexiZone - Multi, FlexiZone - Single, Face Detection), Manual
- Focus areas: 61 AF points (41 cross-type AF points) with High-density Reticular AF

Exposure/metering
- Exposure modes: Scene Intelligent Auto, Program AE, Shutter priority AE, Aperture priority AE, Manual exposure, Bulb exposure, Custom (3×), Movie
- Exposure metering: TTL, full aperture, 63 zones
- Metering modes: Evaluative, Partial, Spot, Center-weighted Average

Flash
- Flash: External

Shutter
- Shutter: Electronic focal-plane
- Shutter speed range: 30 sec. – 1/8000 sec. and Bulb; X-sync at 1/200 sec.
- Continuous shooting: 6.0 fps for 65 JPEG frames or for 13 RAW frames

Viewfinder
- Viewfinder: Eye-level pentaprism with 100% coverage and 0.71x magnification / Electronic (Live View)

Image processing
- Image processor: DIGIC 5+

General
- LCD screen: 3.2" (8.1 cm) Clear View II colour TFT LCD screen with 1,040,000 dots
- Battery: Li-Ion LP-E6 Rechargeable (1800 mAh); also works with LP-E6NH (2130 mAh); 1 x lithium battery CR1616 (time/date)
- Optional battery packs: BG-E11 grip allows the use of 6 AA cells, one LP-E6 battery or two LP-E6 batteries
- Dimensions: 152 mm × 116.4 mm × 76.4 mm (5.98 in × 4.58 in × 3.01 in)
- Weight: 860 g (30 oz) (body only); 945 g (33.3 oz) (CIPA standard)
- Made in: Japan

Chronology
- Replaced: Canon EOS-5D Mark II
- Successor: Canon EOS 5D Mark IV, Canon EOS 5Ds

A video for the Wikimedia Foundation shot using a Canon EOS 5D Mark III

The Canon EOS 5D Mark III is a professional-grade 22.3 megapixel full-frame digital single-lens reflex (DSLR) camera made by Canon. Announced on 2 March 2012 as the successor to the EOS 5D Mark II, the camera featured a 61-point autofocus system inherited from the professional EOS-1D X, high ISO performance up to 25,600, and dual memory card slots. This date coincided with the 25th anniversary of the announcement of the first camera in the EOS line, the EOS 650, and was also Canon's 75th anniversary. The camera went on sale later in March with a retail price of $3,499 in the US, £2999 in the UK, and €3569 in the Eurozone.

The EOS 5D Mark III received positive reviews from photography critics and won multiple industry awards, including the European Imaging and Sound Association (EISA) European Advanced SLR Camera 2012–2013 award and the Technical Image Press Association (TIPA) Best Video DSLR award in 2012. Reviewers particularly praised the camera's autofocus system, high ISO performance, and versatility for both stills and video work, with Digital Photography Review concluding it was "in almost every aspect a better camera than its predecessor and an extremely enjoyable photographic tool."

Canon announced the camera's successor, the Canon EOS 5D Mark IV, on 25 August 2016.

== Features ==
New features over the EOS 5D Mark II are:

- Resolution increased to 22.3 effective megapixels full-frame CMOS sensor (5D Mark II has 21.0 megapixels)
- DIGIC 5+ image processor (as opposed to the DIGIC 4)
- Maximum ISO speed increased to ISO 25600 (50, 51200, 102400 as optional expanded settings) – Compared to ISO 6400 (50, 12800, and 25600 as optional expanded settings)
- New 61-point autofocus (AF) system with 41 cross-type AF points and five dual cross-type points, and High-density Reticular AF – nine AF points plus six Assist Points on the 5D Mark II. The Mark III's autofocus system was inherited partly from the then recently announced EOS-1D X, and marks the first time since the EOS-3 film SLR that Canon has put its top-of-the-line autofocus system in a non-1-series body.
- Faster continuous shooting at 6 fps (3.9 fps for the 5D Mark II)
- New metering zones with 63 zones – compared to TTL, full aperture, 35 zones
- Silent, low vibration TTL shooting modes (single shot or 3 fps) – compared to live-view-only silent shooting modes.
- New 100% viewfinder coverage that offers 0.71× magnification – compared to 98% viewfinder coverage
- Larger 3.2″ (8.1 cm) LCD with 3:2 aspect ratio (3″/7.5 cm LCD screen with approx. 920,000 dots resolution, in 4:3 ratio on the 5D Mark II). In turn, this means that the native still images of the Mk III completely fill the screen, while the Mk II's native images are displayed with a black border on the bottom of the LCD. Also, while HD video remains letterboxed on the Mk III LCD, as on the Mk II, the 3:2 ratio allows more of the screen to be used for video display.
- Headphone-out to monitor audio (the previous one having none)
- Dual card slots: one CompactFlash (CF) with full UDMA support, and one SD (including SDHC and SDXC cards, but does not exploit the UHS-I bus) – the Mark II has only one CF slot.
- Eyecup Eg – as opposed to the Eyecup Eb
- Improved weather sealing (resistant to water and dust, although it is not waterproof)

As with the 5D Mark II, the shutter life is rated at 150,000 cycles.

== Reception ==
The Canon EOS 5D Mark III received positive reviews from photography critics and publications, with particular praise for its autofocus system and high ISO performance.

The camera won multiple industry awards in 2012. The European Imaging and Sound Association (EISA) named it European Advanced SLR Camera 2012–2013, praising it as an "easy-to-use, professional quality, DSLR movie camera" with "substantial improvements in real-life photography as well as in performance" compared to its predecessor. The Technical Image Press Association (TIPA) awarded it Best Video DSLR in 2012.

Professional reviews highlighted the camera's versatility and improvements over the 5D Mark II. Digital Photography Review concluded that "it is indeed a great camera" and that "the 5D Mark III is in almost every aspect a better camera than its predecessor and an extremely enjoyable photographic tool." Photography Blog gave the camera 4.5 out of 5 stars, describing it as "a well-rounded DSLR that can successfully try its hand at most photographic disciplines" that represents "another stride forward for both stills and video." Imaging Resource praised the autofocus system as revolutionary, with field testers noting exceptional high ISO performance, with one reviewer stating the camera could "shoot indoors without flash at ISO 12,800 with noise and detail levels similar to ISO 3,200 on the 5D Mark II."

Critics consistently praised the 61-point autofocus system, inherited from the professional EOS-1D X, as a significant upgrade that addressed many limitations of its predecessor. The camera's build quality and handling also received positive remarks, with reviewers noting its magnesium body construction and improved weather sealing. However, some reviewers noted that while the camera excelled at RAW image quality, its JPEG output showed visibly destructive noise reduction even at low sensitivities, resulting in less detail than expected from a 22-megapixel sensor. Concerns were also raised about the camera's high launch price of £2999/€3569.99/$3499.95, which was substantially higher than the Mark II and $500 more expensive than the competing Nikon D800.

== Known defects ==
Canon issued a product advisory indicating that the camera's LCD panel, when illuminated in extremely dark environments, may impact the camera's light metering when shooting. Any camera bodies sold with the issue will be fixed by Canon free of charge, and any body shipped after the first week of May 2012 likely had the defect already rectified.

== Firmware updates ==
Firmware	Release date	Fixes and improvements
1.2.1	30 April 2013	Output of uncompressed video via HDMI. Autofocus ability up to f/8.
1.2.3	30 October 2013	Fixed a number of minor bugs.
1.3.3	29 January 2015	Fixed minor menu issues and improved AF control-ability when shooting in Live View mode with a wide-angle lens.
1.3.4	14 November 2016	Corrected a phenomenon in which when using the camera with the EF 70-300mm f/4-5.6 IS II USM lens, even if lens aberration correction is set to "Enable", correction will not be applied.
1.3.5	29 November 2017	Corrected a phenomenon in which standard exposure may not be obtained, or an irregular exposure may result, when Silent LV (Live View) shooting with the following TS-E lenses: TS-E 50mm f/2.8L MACRO, TS-E 90mm f/2.8L MACRO, or TS-E 135mm f/4L MACRO.
1.3.6	12 September 2019	Corrected a PTP communications vulnerability and a vulnerability related to firmware update.

== Notable works shot on the camera ==
- Life After Beth
- Kung Fury
- Wallpaper for OS X El Capitan
- Hale County This Morning, This Evening

== Cubesat ==
In July 2020 an attempt was made to launch a Cubesat named CE-SAT 1B equipped with a 5D Mark III sensor on an Electron rocket. The rocket failed to reach orbit.

Type	Sensor	Class	00	01	02	03	04	05	06	07	08	09	10	11	12	13	14	15	16	17	18	19	20	21	22	23	24	25	26
DSLR	Full-frame	Flagship				1Ds		1Ds Mk II			1Ds Mk III					1D C													
DSLR	Full-frame	Flagship				1Ds		1Ds Mk II			1Ds Mk III				1D X					1D X Mk II ^{T}			1D X Mk III ^{T}						
DSLR	APS-H	Flagship			1D			1D Mk II	1D Mk II N		1D Mk III		1D Mk IV																
DSLR	Full-frame	Professional																	5DS / 5DS R										
DSLR	Full-frame	Professional							5D			_{x} 5D Mk II			_{x} 5D Mk III					5D Mk IV ^{T}									
DSLR	Full-frame	Advanced														_{x} 6D					_{x} 6D Mk II ^{AT}								
DSLR	APS-C	Advanced											_{x} 7D					_{x} 7D Mk II											
DSLR	APS-C	Mid-range						20Da								_{x} 60Da ^{A}													
DSLR	APS-C	Mid-range		D30	D60	10D		20D	30D		40D	_{x} 50D		_{x} 60D ^{A}			_{x} 70D ^{AT}		80D ^{AT}				90D ^{AT}						
DSLR	APS-C	Mid-range																	760D ^{AT}		77D ^{AT}								
DSLR	APS-C	Entry-level					300D	350D		400D	450D	_{x} 500D	_{x} 550D	_{x} 600D ^{A}		_{x} 650D ^{AT}	_{x} 700D ^{AT}		_{x} 750D ^{AT}		800D ^{AT}			850D ^{AT}					
DSLR	APS-C	Entry-level															_{x} 100D ^{T}		_{x} 200D ^{AT}				250D ^{AT}						
DSLR	APS-C	Entry-level										1000D		_{x} 1100D			_{x} 1200D			1300D		2000D							
DSLR	APS-C	Value																				4000D							
Early models			Canon EOS DCS 5 (1995); Canon EOS DCS 3 (1995); Canon EOS DCS 1 (1995); Canon EOS D2000 (1998); Canon EOS D6000 (1998)																										
Type	Sensor	Spec																											
Type	Sensor	Spec	00	01	02	03	04	05	06	07	08	09	10	11	12	13	14	15	16	17	18	19	20	21	22	23	24	25	26
