= Canon EOS 5D Mark II =

2008 full-frame digital single-lens reflex camera

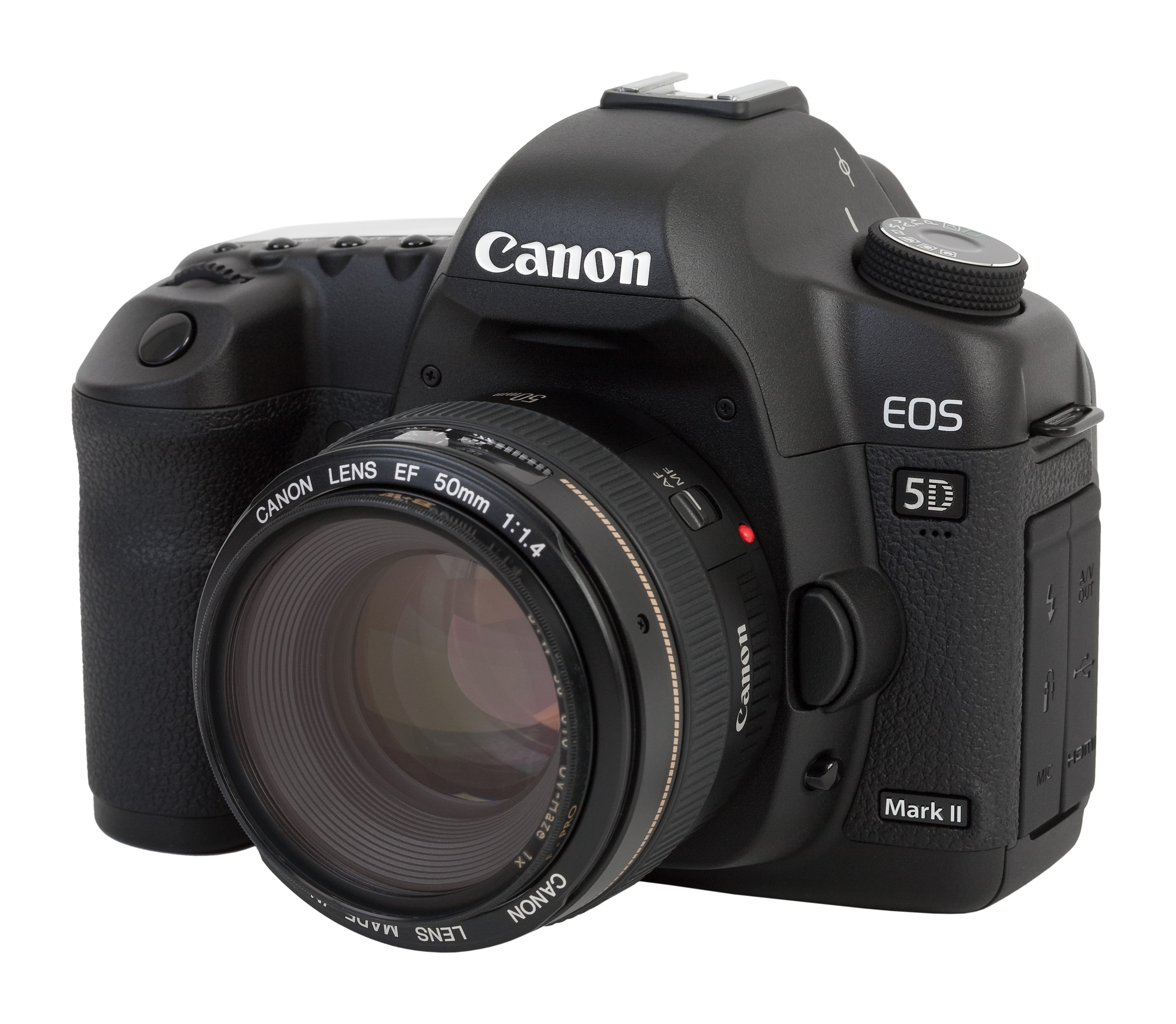

Overview
- Maker: Canon Inc.
- Type: Digital single-lens reflex
- Released: November 2008
- Intro price: US$2699.00

Lens
- Lens mount: Canon EF
- Lens: Interchangeable

Sensor/medium
- Sensor size: 36 × 24 mm (full-frame)
- Maximum resolution: 5,616 × 3,744 (21.0 effective megapixels)
- Film speed: 100–6400 (expansion from 50 up to 25,600)
- Storage media: CompactFlash (CF) (Type I or Type II)

Focusing
- Focus modes: One-shot, AI Servo, AI-Focus, Manual
- Focus areas: 9 user points + 6 assist points

Exposure/metering
- Exposure modes: Full auto, programmed, shutter priority, aperture priority, manual
- Exposure metering: TTL, full aperture, 35 zones
- Metering modes: Evaluative, Partial, Spot, C/Wgt Average

Shutter
- Shutter: Electronically controlled focal-plane
- Shutter speed range: 30 to 1/8000 s
- Continuous shooting: up to 3.9 frame/s.

Viewfinder
- Viewfinder: Fixed eye-level pentaprism
- Frame coverage: 98%
- Image processor: DIGIC 4

General
- LCD screen: 3.0 inches (76 mm), 640 × 480 (921,600 dots), Live View
- Battery: Li-Ion LP-E6 Rechargeable (1800 mAh)
- Optional battery packs: BG-E6 grip allows use of 6 AA cells, a single LP-E6 or two LP-E6 batteries
- Dimensions: 152×113.5×75 mm (5.98×4.47×2.95 in)
- Weight: 810 g (29 oz) (body only)
- Made in: Japan

Chronology
- Replaced: Canon EOS 5D
- Replaced by: Canon EOS 5D Mark III

The Canon EOS 5D Mark II is a 21.0 effective megapixel full-frame CMOS digital single-lens reflex camera made by Canon, the first Canon EOS camera to have video recording capabilities. It succeeds the EOS 5D and was announced on 17 September 2008.

On 2 March 2012, Canon announced the camera's successor, the Canon EOS 5D Mark III. On 24 December 2012, Canon Japan moved the camera to their "Old Products" list, effectively discontinuing the camera.

== Improvements over original EOS 5D ==
- 21.0 megapixels (5,616 × 3,744 pixels), compared to 12.8 megapixels (4,368 × 2,912 pixels).
- DIGIC 4 image processor, compared to DIGIC II.
- 100 to 6400 ISO (expandable to L (50), H1 (12800), H2 (25600)), compared to 100 to 1600 (expandable to L (50), H (3200)).
- 3.9 frames per second continuous shooting (78 JPEG or 13 Raw in a single burst), compared to 3 frame/s (60 JPEG or 17 Raw).
- Small Raw modes: sRAW1 mode (10 megapixel/3861 × 2574 pixels), sRAW2 mode (5.2 megapixel/2784 × 1856 pixels).
- 98% viewfinder coverage with 0.71× magnification, compared to 96% coverage.
- Larger 3.0-inch (76 mm) LCD with 920,000 pixels, compared to 2.5-inch (64 mm).
- 1800 mAh LP-E6 battery, compared to 1390 mAh BP-511A.

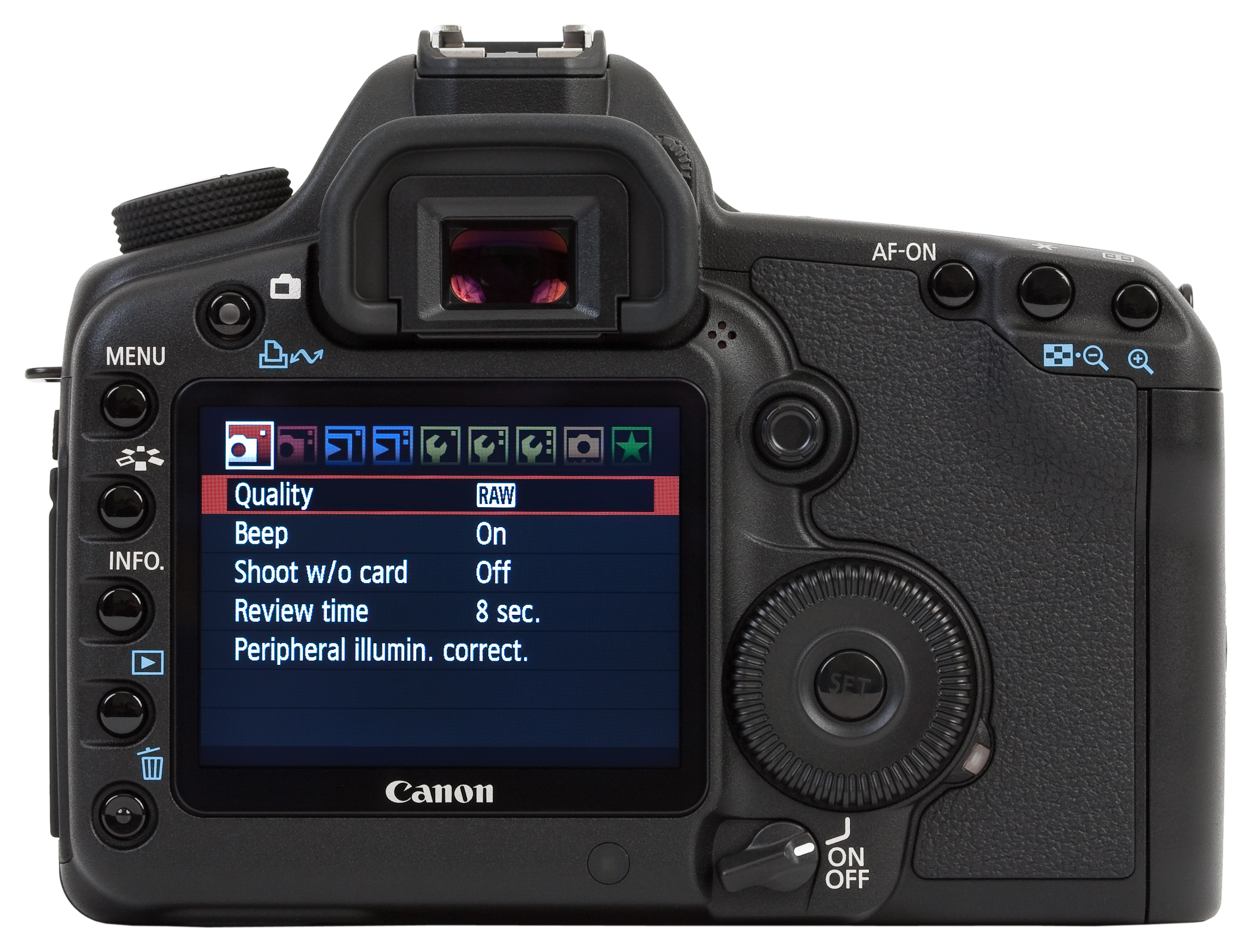
Back of the camera with LCD

== New features ==
- Movie recording full HD at 1920 × 1080 and SDTV at 640 × 480 resolution.
- Monaural microphone for audio during video recording, speaker for playback and microphone jack for external stereo microphone
- Live preview with ExpSim LV "exposure simulation" live preview (full exposure preview control utilizing ExpSim LV, a first for video in a DSLR)
- Live preview with contrast-detect autofocus
- HDMI video output for live preview or playing clips and images on an external monitor via Type C MiniHDMI port
- Dust reduction system to perform automatic sensor cleaning
- Battery management software

The 5D Mark II is the first camera in the EOS line to provide video recording functions. Still photography during video recording is possible, but the camera suspends recording video until the final still frame is captured.

The lithium-ion battery for the 5D Mark II (LP-E6) has an 1800 mAh capacity. Each battery contains a microchip with a unique identifier for reporting charge status and battery health for display on the camera. The 5D Mark II's "Battery Info" screen can track battery health and shooting history for up to six LP-E6 batteries.

The camera has native ISO values of 100 multiplied by a power of 2; other ISO values are obtained by a digital exposure push (ISO values that are multiples of 125) or digital exposure pull (ISO values that are multiples of 160). The digital exposure push ISO is 1/3 stop greater than the native ISO, and a digital exposure pull ISO is 1/3 stop less than the native ISO. The digital exposure push ISO settings produce more noise than the native settings with a reduced dynamic range, and the digital exposure pull ISO settings produce less noise than the native settings.

== Video recording ==
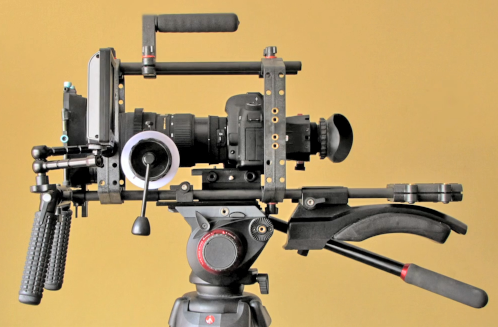
A 5D Mark II with follow focus, matte box and other cinematography equipment

While the Nikon D90 was the first DSLR to shoot 720p high-definition video, and the Panasonic GH1, a MILC, was capable of 1080p/24 recording before the 5D Mark II officially gained this capability, the latter was the first full-frame DSLR to feature 1080p video recording. With these features, Canon 5D Mark II was able to compete with high-end digital movie cameras available that time. Its release started the trend of "DSLR revolution", significantly changing the world of independent filmmaking for upcoming years. The Canon PowerShot SX 1 IS followed with 1080p video in a bridge digital camera soon after.

The 16:9 aspect ratio portion of the sensor used in video mode is similar in sensitive area to a VistaVision 8/35 frame. This large sensor allows videos to be recorded with very shallow depth of field for a "film look". The 21 megapixel sensor is downsampled to HD resolution by only using every third line and 4:2:0 chroma subsampling, leading to concern about Moiré patterns in recorded video.

Video clips can be up to 4 GB in size, approximately 12 minutes of 1080p HD or 24 minutes of SD (640 x 480) footage. These limits stem from the 4 GB maximum file size supported by the FAT32 filesystem format used on Compact Flash cards. The camera also imposes a hard maximum clip length of 29 minutes 59 seconds if the 4 GB limit has not already been reached. Video and audio is recorded to QuickTime (MOV) container files with H.264/MPEG-4 (Base Profile @ L5) compressed video and uncompressed 48 kHz/16-bit PCM audio. The bitrate for 1080p is approximately 38 megabits per second (4.8 MB/s), while for SD it is approximately 17 megabits per second (2.2 MB/s). Although the internal microphone is mono, stereo audio is supported through the audio input jack. When recording for long periods, especially in warmer climates, increased video noise may occur due to CMOS overheating. Rolling shutter, a phenomenon where vertical lines look bent on moving objects, when the camera is in motion is a significant issue with the Canon 5D Mark II.

== Video functionality ==
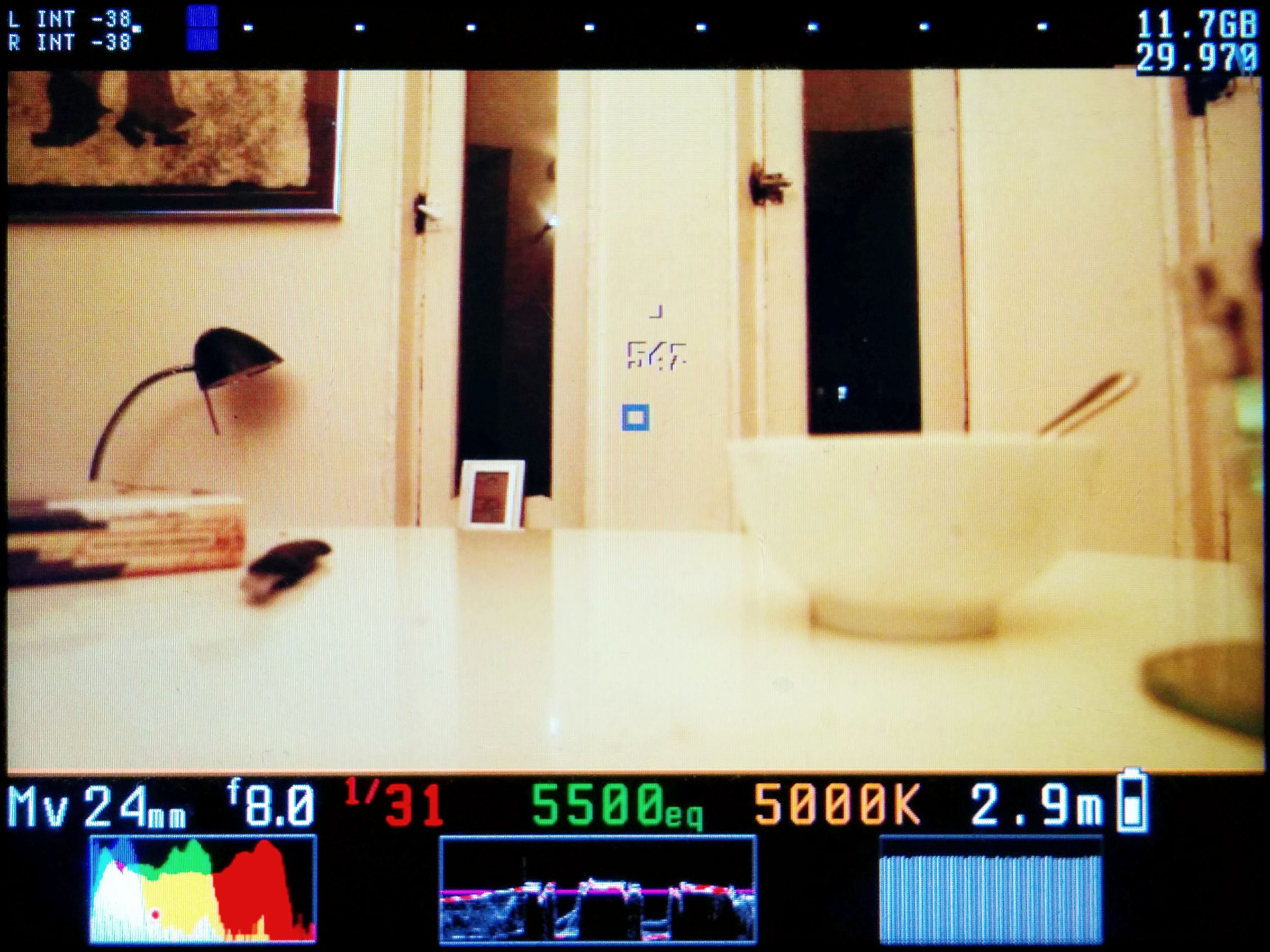
Magic Lantern overlays on the liveview screen of the 5D Mark II

The EOS 5D Mark II is capable of video recording in low-light situations and it is sold for a relatively low price, compared with professional video cameras. For the first eighteen months of its release, the camera only had a 30 frame per second (30p) video mode. On 15 March 2010, Canon released a firmware upgrade to add a 25p mode for PAL format compatibility and a 24p mode for compatibility with motion picture film cameras. The firmware update also modified the 30p mode to record 29.97 frame/s and the new 24p mode actually records 23.976 frame/s to have frame rates compatible with NTSC. Lastly, the update added manual control of the audio record levels and an official way to disable the automatic gain control.

Following the success of the Canon Hack Development Kit (CHDK) for Canon's PowerShot cameras, third party firmware add-on was also produced for the 5D Mark II. The Magic Lantern firmware add-on provides many additional video and cinematography related controls and meters such as false colors, and zebra stripes for exposure control, depth of field estimates via peaking filters, audio VU meters and disables the automatic gain control on the microphone input (manual gain control for microphone input has since been added to Canon's official firmware, as noted above). It also provides a stable output of uncompressed 14-Bit RAW video data onto fast UDMA 7 CF cards at almost HD resolution (1004p vs. 1080p at Full HD).

== Independent film and television ==
Notable film and television productions that used the Canon 5D Mark II include (in order of release):

- The BBC coverage of the Grand Prix Snooker in the first week of September 2009 was the first BBC programme to use the camera.
- The opening title sequence for the 35th season of NBC's Saturday Night Live, first broadcast on 26 September 2009. The camera, alongside the Canon 7D, was used due to its size, which allowed covert shooting on the streets of New York City, and depth of field capabilities, making it a suitable substitute for the series' usual 35mm film.
- The music video for the Japanese band Sakanaction's song "Aruku Around" (2010), a winning entry of the 14th Japan Media Arts Festival, was shot in a single take with a Canon EOS 5D Mark II camera.
- French filmmaker, Quentin Dupieux, shot Rubber (2010) entirely with the Canon 5D Mark II.
- The House episode "Help Me", broadcast by Fox on 17 May 2010, was shot entirely on the Canon 5D Mark II, replacing the drama's usual 35mm film format. Portions of the seventh season were also recorded with a 5D Mark II.
- The BBC Two comedy series Shelfstackers, first broadcast on 4 September 2010, is the first BBC programme to be entirely shot on the camera. The corporation had initially refused its use due to "lack of quality" but were persuaded otherwise by the series' director, Dom Bridges. All six episodes of the series were shot on the camera for a total budget of £160,000.
- The Road to Coronation Street, broadcast by BBC Four on 16 September 2010, is the first UK television drama to be shot on the Canon 5D Mark II. The drama's director of photography was impressed and plans to use the camera on the seventh series of the BBC One drama Hustle.
- The 2011 short film Scenes from the Suburbs directed by Spike Jonze used a version of the camera modified to use Panavision lenses to shoot all of the night scenes alongside 35mm film used for the day scenes.
- The re-booted Hawaii Five-0 TV series is currently shot using Canon 5DmkII.
- Behzat Ç. Bir Ankara Polisiyesi, a Turkish TV series is being shot on Canon 5DmkII.
- Some scenes of the 2012 film Act of Valor were shot using the Canon 5D Mark II.
- Dimensions, a multi-award-winning 2011 British period sci-fi feature film, was shot using Canon 5D Mark II for 'less than the price of Batman's cape'.
- Marvel's The Avengers is reported to have some Canon 5D MkII shots.
- Department, a 2012 Bollywood movie, is reported to have been shot using Canon 5D Mark II
- ParaNorman, a 2012 3D stop-motion animated adventure horror film produced by LAIKA, Inc., was shot on sixty Canon 5D Mark II cameras.
- Frances Ha, a 2012 American comedy-drama film shot by cinematographer Sam Levy, was filmed in digital black and white using a Canon 5D Mark II.
- Nirel, First International Tulu movie, directed by Ranjith Bajpe, is reported to have been shot using Canon 5D Mark II.
- Escape from Tomorrow, a 2013 feature film, was shot guerilla-style with two Canon 5D Mark II cameras at the Disney theme parks.
- Coherence, a 2013 feature film, was shot using the Canon 5D MkII.
- Barack Obama's 2009 presidential portrait was taken on a Canon 5D Mark II, making it the first official presidential portrait taken with a digital camera.

== Software ==
The included software package contains the following:

- Digital Photo Professional
- ZoomBrowser EX / ImageBrowser
- PhotoStitch
- EOS Utility
- Picture Style Editor

== Firmware updates ==
Release date	Firmware	Fixes
2009-01-07	1.0.7	Early buyers of the camera reported black pixels appearing in high contrast situations. In late 2008, Canon officially acknowledged that there was an issue with black dots and vertical banding noise in certain circumstances.
2009-06-02	1.1.0	Originally, the camera lacked manual control when filming video. On 2 June 2009 version 1.1.0 of the firmware was released which provided control over aperture, shutter speed and ISO while recording video.
2009-12-17	1.2.4	Supports the WFT-E4 II wireless file transmitter and to correct an issue where visible noise may appear in photos taken in continuous Bulb shooting.
2010-03-16	2.0.3	Supports 1080p at NTSC 29.97 frame/s, 1080p at PAL 25.00 frame/s and 1080p at cinematography 23.976 frame/s. It also added a function for manually adjusting the sound recording level (64 levels), a histogram display (brightness or RGB) for shooting movies in manual exposure, shutter-priority AE mode (TV) and aperture-priority AE (Av) mode to the exposure modes for shooting movies and changed the audio sampling frequency from 44.1 kHz to 48 kHz. On 17 March 2010 the firmware was found to have some bugs with the audio functions and thus retired.
2010-03-19	2.0.4	Fixes the 2.0.3 bugs, and add 24p framerate and manual audio recording.
2010-10-19	2.0.8	Solves several issues related to the camera operations under specific circumstances.
2011-05-30	2.0.9	This update improves performance with certain UDMA cards and solves other issues.
2011-11-14	2.1.1	Fixes a phenomenon where shooting stops after capturing one image when in continuous shooting mode or auto exposure bracketing (AEB) continuous mode. It also corrects wording in the Dutch language menu screen.
2012-02-29	2.1.2	This update optimizes the camera's performance when using certain UDMA 7-compatible CF cards released in February 2012 or later.

Type	Sensor	Class	00	01	02	03	04	05	06	07	08	09	10	11	12	13	14	15	16	17	18	19	20	21	22	23	24	25	26
DSLR	Full-frame	Flagship				1Ds		1Ds Mk II			1Ds Mk III					1D C													
DSLR	Full-frame	Flagship				1Ds		1Ds Mk II			1Ds Mk III				1D X					1D X Mk II ^{T}			1D X Mk III ^{T}						
DSLR	APS-H	Flagship			1D			1D Mk II	1D Mk II N		1D Mk III		1D Mk IV																
DSLR	Full-frame	Professional																	5DS / 5DS R										
DSLR	Full-frame	Professional							5D			_{x} 5D Mk II			_{x} 5D Mk III					5D Mk IV ^{T}									
DSLR	Full-frame	Advanced														_{x} 6D					_{x} 6D Mk II ^{AT}								
DSLR	APS-C	Advanced											_{x} 7D					_{x} 7D Mk II											
DSLR	APS-C	Mid-range						20Da								_{x} 60Da ^{A}													
DSLR	APS-C	Mid-range		D30	D60	10D		20D	30D		40D	_{x} 50D		_{x} 60D ^{A}			_{x} 70D ^{AT}		80D ^{AT}				90D ^{AT}						
DSLR	APS-C	Mid-range																	760D ^{AT}		77D ^{AT}								
DSLR	APS-C	Entry-level					300D	350D		400D	450D	_{x} 500D	_{x} 550D	_{x} 600D ^{A}		_{x} 650D ^{AT}	_{x} 700D ^{AT}		_{x} 750D ^{AT}		800D ^{AT}			850D ^{AT}					
DSLR	APS-C	Entry-level															_{x} 100D ^{T}		_{x} 200D ^{AT}				250D ^{AT}						
DSLR	APS-C	Entry-level										1000D		_{x} 1100D			_{x} 1200D			1300D		2000D							
DSLR	APS-C	Value																				4000D							
Early models			Canon EOS DCS 5 (1995); Canon EOS DCS 3 (1995); Canon EOS DCS 1 (1995); Canon EOS D2000 (1998); Canon EOS D6000 (1998)																										
Type	Sensor	Spec																											
Type	Sensor	Spec	00	01	02	03	04	05	06	07	08	09	10	11	12	13	14	15	16	17	18	19	20	21	22	23	24	25	26
