= Canon EOS 7D Mark II =

2014 APS-C digital single-lens reflex camera

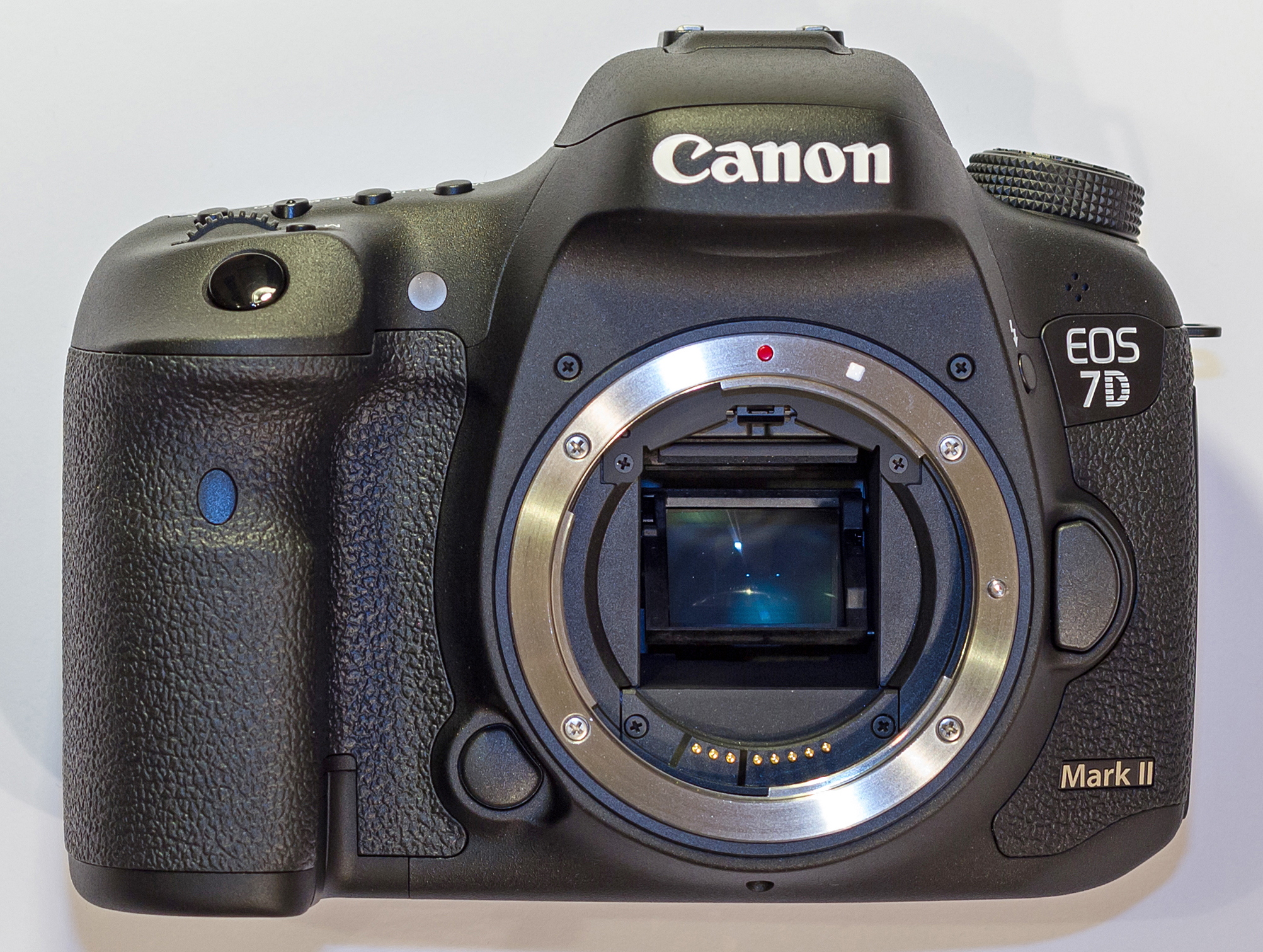

Overview
- Maker: Canon Inc.
- Type: Digital single-lens reflex camera
- Intro price: US$1799.00

Lens
- Lens mount: Canon EF-S
- Lens: Interchangeable

Sensor/medium
- Sensor type: CMOS
- Sensor size: 22.4 × 15.0 mm (APS-C size)
- Maximum resolution: 5472 × 3648 (20.2 effective megapixels)
- Film speed: 100–16000 in 1/3 stop increments (expandable to H1: 25600; H2: 51200)
- Storage media: Dual slots: CompactFlash (CF) card Type I (UDMA-7 supported) and SD/SDHC/SDXC card (UHS-I bus supported), W-E1 SD card-shaped wifi adapter

Focusing
- Focus modes: One-Shot, AI Focus, AI Servo, Live View (FlexiZone - Multi, FlexiZone - Single, Face detection, Movie Servo), Manual
- Focus areas: 65 cross-type AF points

Exposure/metering
- Exposure modes: Scene Intelligent Auto, Program AE, Shutter priority AE, Aperture priority AE, Manual exposure, Bulb exposure, Custom (3×), Movie
- Exposure metering: TTL, full aperture, 252 zones
- Metering modes: Evaluative, Partial, Spot, Centre-weighted Average

Shutter
- Shutter: Electromechanical focal-plane
- Shutter speed range: 1/8000–30 s and Bulb; X-sync at 1/250 s
- Continuous shooting: 10 fps with buffer up to 1,090 JPEG frames or 31 raw frames when using a UDMA-7 CompactFlash card

Viewfinder
- Viewfinder: Eye-level pentaprism / LCD (Live View)
- Viewfinder magnification: 1.0x
- Frame coverage: 100%

Image processing
- Image processor: Dual DIGIC 6

General
- LCD screen: 3.0″ (7.7 cm) Clear View II colour TFT LCD screen with 1,040,000 dots
- Battery: Li-Ion LP-E6/LP-E6N rechargeable battery (1800 mAh/1865 mAh respectively)
- Optional battery packs: BG-E16 grip allows the use of 6 AA cells, one LP-E6N battery or two LP-E6N batteries
- Dimensions: 148.6 mm × 112.4 mm × 78.2 mm (5.85 in × 4.43 in × 3.08 in)
- Weight: 820 g (29 oz) (1.81 lb) (body only)
- Made in: Japan

Chronology
- Predecessor: Canon EOS 7D
- Successor: Canon EOS R7 (mirrorless)

The Canon EOS 7D Mark II is a professional digital single-lens reflex camera made by Canon. It was announced on September 15, 2014 with a suggested retail price of US$1,799. It features a 20.2 effective megapixel APS-C CMOS sensor, Full HD video recording at 60 fps, 10.0 frames per second continuous shooting, a 100% accuracy viewfinder that offers 1× magnification. It also features a 65-point auto-focus system, a built-in Speedlite transmitter and a new 150k RGB pixels + IR metering sensor. It was preceded by the Canon EOS 7D.

The 7D Mark II was named the "Best Digital SLR Expert" in 2015 by the Technical Image Press Association. Also, the 7D Mark II won the Japanese 2015 Camera Grand Prix Camera of the Year award.

== Features ==
- 20.2 effective megapixel APS-C CMOS sensor
- Dual DIGIC 6 image processors with 14-bit processing
- Liveview mode
- 100% viewfinder frame coverage with 1.0× magnification with a 50 mm lens
- 10.0 frames per second continuous shooting
- ISO sensitivity 100–16,000 (expandable to 51,200)
- 3.0-inch Clear View II LCD screen with 1,040,000 dots resolution
- 65-point auto-focus system, all cross-type. Center point is high precision, double cross-type with −3 EV sensitivity
- 252-zone color-sensitive metering system
- GPS tagging
- EOS Scene Detection System with a new 150,000-pixel/RGB+IR metering sensor.
- Magnesium alloy body
- Popup flash
- Intervalometer
- Weather sealing (resistance to water and dust)
- In-camera automatic lens distortion correction for most Canon lenses produced since 1995

=== Autofocus and metering ===
The 7D Mark II has 65 autofocus points, a similar system as on the Canon EOS 1D X. However, certain lenses do not support all 65 AF points. The AF system uses a translucent LCD in the viewfinder to overlay image data with the viewfinder image. The EOS 7D Mark II camera features the next generation of Canon's exclusive Dual Pixel CMOS AF (DAF) technology, originally introduced with the Canon EOS 70D camera. Dual Pixel CMOS AF employs proprietary Canon sensor technology in which effective pixels are able to perform both imaging and phase-detection focus measurement simultaneously to achieve dramatically improved AF performance in both video and Live View still imaging modes.

With Canon's Dual Pixel CMOS AF system and customizable Movie Servo AF, the camera provides continuous phase-detection AF during video recording for quick and accurate focus tracking of moving subjects over approximately eighty percent of the image area measured horizontally and vertically. DAF focusing modes include Face Detection with Tracking, FlexiZone Multi with 31 AF zones, and FlexiZone Single that allows users to position a focusing frame on the camera's LCD screen.

=== Shutter ===
The shutter is rated to 200,000 shots and is capable of speeds up to 1/8000 s, with a flash sync speed of 1/250 s. Using compatible external flashes, flash sync speeds up to 1/8000 s are possible. Additionally, the camera can be set to automatically delay its shutter release to compensate for flickering electric lights. The camera's reflex mirror is driven by a motor that slows the mirror to reduce vibration during high-speed shooting. This motor also enables unique new Silent Shooting Modes, which reduce camera noise, at the cost of a slight increase of shutter lag time from 0.055 s to 0.105 s.

=== Ergonomics ===
The 7D Mark II has roughly the same dimension as the older 5D Mark III with an updated button layout. It also features a 100% viewfinder with 1× magnification with a 50 mm lens.

The 7D Mark II features a dedicated movie mode switch. The camera supports Canon's Stepping Motor (STM) lenses, which significantly reduce focus motor noise from the lens. The EOS 7D Mark II features a stereo microphone port and outputs stereo audio via the camera's mini-HDMI port. The camera is equipped with a headphone jack for real-time audio monitoring, as well as a silent control feature that allows users to adjust audio levels during recordings.

=== Speed ===
The 7D Mark II has dual DIGIC 6 processors and can reach 10 frames per second continuous shooting. According to Canon, the buffer throughput allows up to 1,090 frames in large fine JPEG mode and up to 31 frames in raw when using a UDMA-7 CF Card.

== Accessories ==
When newly purchased, the Canon 7D Mark II model comes equipped with:

- LP-E6N Lithium-Ion Battery Pack for EOS 7D Mark II DSLR Camera
- LC-E6 Charger for LP-E6 Battery Pack
- Eyecup Eg
- RF-3 Camera Cover
- IFC-150U II USB 3.0 Interface Cable for EOS 7D Mark II DSLR
- Wide Camera Strap
- Battery Cover
- Software CD-ROM

== Video ==
The EOS 7D Mark II can shoot in 1080p Full HD or 720p HD video up to 60p, enabling slow-motion capture at full resolution in either ALL-I or IPB codecs with optional embedded timecode. It allows either .MOV and .MP4 recording formats. The camera's mini-HDMI port can be used to record uncompressed Full HD video to external recorders.

Type	Sensor	Class	00	01	02	03	04	05	06	07	08	09	10	11	12	13	14	15	16	17	18	19	20	21	22	23	24	25	26
DSLR	Full-frame	Flagship				1Ds		1Ds Mk II			1Ds Mk III					1D C													
DSLR	Full-frame	Flagship				1Ds		1Ds Mk II			1Ds Mk III				1D X					1D X Mk II ^{T}			1D X Mk III ^{T}						
DSLR	APS-H	Flagship			1D			1D Mk II	1D Mk II N		1D Mk III		1D Mk IV																
DSLR	Full-frame	Professional																	5DS / 5DS R										
DSLR	Full-frame	Professional							5D			_{x} 5D Mk II			_{x} 5D Mk III					5D Mk IV ^{T}									
DSLR	Full-frame	Advanced														_{x} 6D					_{x} 6D Mk II ^{AT}								
DSLR	APS-C	Advanced											_{x} 7D					_{x} 7D Mk II											
DSLR	APS-C	Mid-range						20Da								_{x} 60Da ^{A}													
DSLR	APS-C	Mid-range		D30	D60	10D		20D	30D		40D	_{x} 50D		_{x} 60D ^{A}			_{x} 70D ^{AT}		80D ^{AT}				90D ^{AT}						
DSLR	APS-C	Mid-range																	760D ^{AT}		77D ^{AT}								
DSLR	APS-C	Entry-level					300D	350D		400D	450D	_{x} 500D	_{x} 550D	_{x} 600D ^{A}		_{x} 650D ^{AT}	_{x} 700D ^{AT}		_{x} 750D ^{AT}		800D ^{AT}			850D ^{AT}					
DSLR	APS-C	Entry-level															_{x} 100D ^{T}		_{x} 200D ^{AT}				250D ^{AT}						
DSLR	APS-C	Entry-level										1000D		_{x} 1100D			_{x} 1200D			1300D		2000D							
DSLR	APS-C	Value																				4000D							
Early models			Canon EOS DCS 5 (1995); Canon EOS DCS 3 (1995); Canon EOS DCS 1 (1995); Canon EOS D2000 (1998); Canon EOS D6000 (1998)																										
Type	Sensor	Spec																											
Type	Sensor	Spec	00	01	02	03	04	05	06	07	08	09	10	11	12	13	14	15	16	17	18	19	20	21	22	23	24	25	26
