= Canon EOS 5DS =

2015 full-frame digital single-lens reflex camera

Canon EOS 5DS (EOS 5Ds)
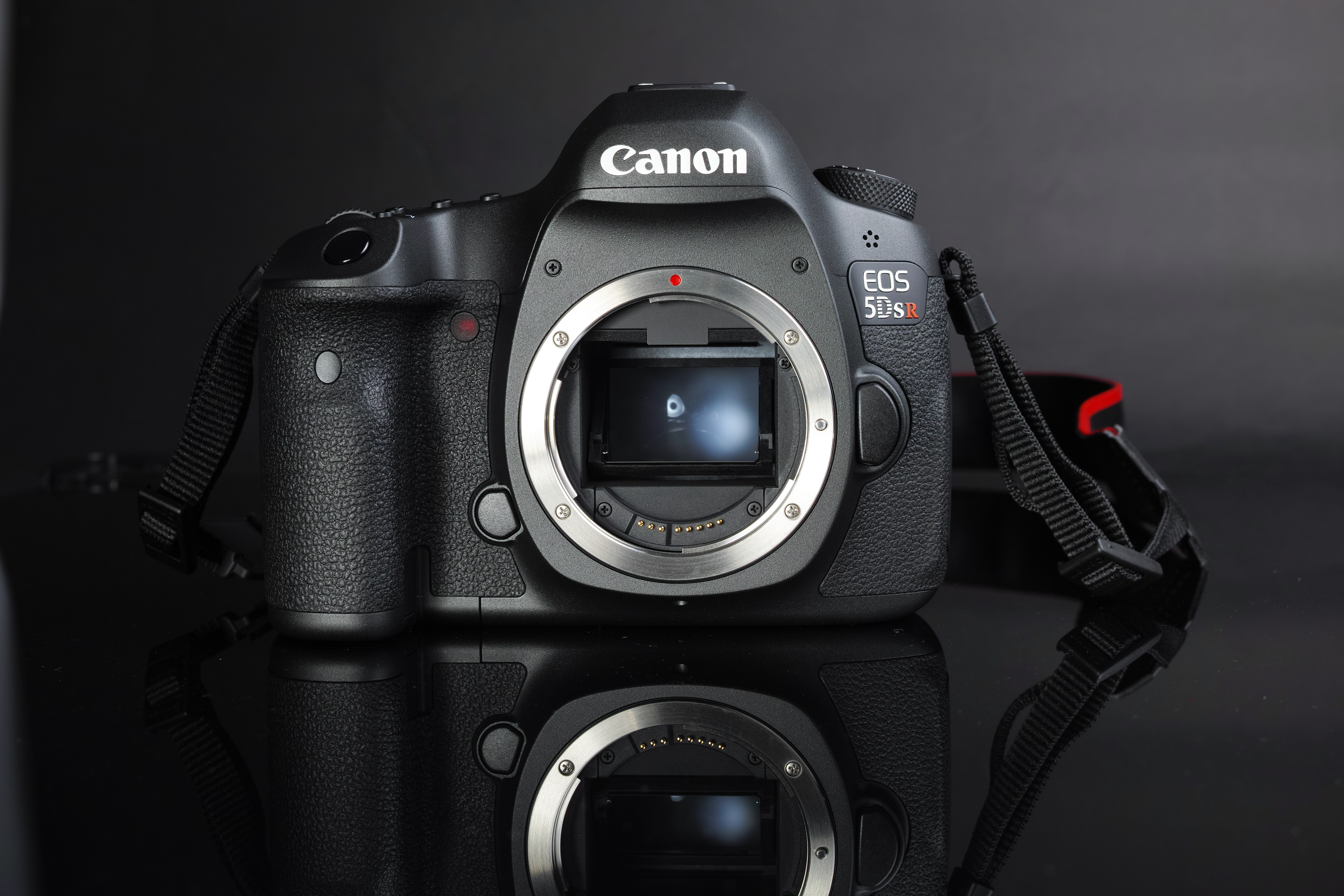
- Canon EOS 5DS R

Overview
- Type: Digital single-lens reflex camera
- Released: June 2015

Lens
- Lens mount: Canon EF
- Lens: Interchangeable

Sensor/medium
- Sensor type: CMOS
- Sensor size: 36×24 mm (Full-frame)
- Maximum resolution: 8688 × 5792 (50.3 effective megapixels)
- Film speed: 100–6400 (expandable from L: 50 to H: 12800)
- Storage media: Dual slots: CompactFlash (CF) card Type I (UDMA-7 supported) and SD/SDHC/SDXC card (*UHS-I compatible),

Focusing
- Focus areas: 61 AF points (41 cross-type AF points) with High-density Reticular AF

Exposure/metering
- Exposure modes: Scene Intelligent Auto, Program AE, Shutter priority AE, Aperture priority AE, Manual Exposure, Bulb Exposure, Custom (3×), Movie
- Exposure metering: Full aperture TTL, 252 zones with 150,000 pixels RGB + IR sensor and EOS Integrated Subject Analysis (iSA)
- Metering modes: Evaluative, Partial, Spot, Centre-weighted Average

Flash
- Flash: External

Shutter
- Shutter: Electromechanical focal-plane
- Shutter speed range: 30 s–1/8000 s and Bulb; X-sync at 1/200 s
- Continuous shooting: 5.0 fps for 31 JPEG frames or 12 RAW frames

Viewfinder
- Viewfinder: Eye-level pentaprism with 100% coverage and 0.71× magnification / LCD (Live View)

Image processing
- Image processor: Dual DIGIC 6
- White balance: Yes
- WB bracketing: Yes

General
- LCD screen: 3.2" (8.1 cm) Clear View II colour TFT LCD screen with 1,040,000 dots resolution
- Battery: Li-Ion LP-E6N rechargeable (1865 mAh), W-E1 SD card-shaped wifi adapter
- Optional battery packs: BG-E11 grip allows the use of 6 AA cells, one LP-E6N or two LP-E6N batteries
- Dimensions: 152×116×76 mm (5.98×4.57×2.99 in)
- Weight: 845 g (29.8 oz) (body only)
- Made in: Japan

Chronology
- Predecessor: Canon EOS 5D Mark III
- Successor: Canon EOS R5 (high-resolution mirrorless)

The Canon EOS 5DS and EOS 5DS R (marketed as the EOS 5Ds and EOS 5Ds R in Japan) are two closely related digital SLR cameras announced by Canon on February 6, 2015. Both are professional full-frame cameras with 50.3-megapixel sensors, the highest of any full-frame camera at the time of announcement. The only difference between the two models is that the sensor of the "R" version includes an optical filter that cancels out the effects of a standard optical low-pass filter. This distinction is roughly similar to that between Nikon's now-replaced D800 and D800E (with the E having a self-cancelling filter). Canon stated that both the 5DS and 5DS R will not replace the older EOS 5D Mark III; therefore, both the 5DS and 5DS R will have their new positions in Canon's DSLR camera lineup.

At the time of announcement, estimated prices were US$3,699.00 and US$3,899.00 (EOS 5DS and EOS 5DS R), with announced date of availability, through authorized Canon retailers, in June 2015.

Despite the record-high pixel count and related storage and processing power, these cameras do not shoot 4K video or high frame rate 1080p video.

Full-size demosaicked jpeg files from this camera occupy approximately 20 megabytes and exceed 8K resolution.

== Features ==
- 50.3 effective megapixels full-frame CMOS sensor
- Dual DIGIC 6 image processors with 14-bit processing
- 100% viewfinder frame coverage with 0.71× magnification
- Intelligent Viewfinder II with additional shooting information display shooting information (first introduced on the EOS 7D Mark II)
- Continuous red illumination (strobing) of all AF points
- 1.3× and 1.6× cropping zone through OVF
- 1080p Full HD video recording at 24p, 25p (25 Hz) and 30p (29.97 Hz) with drop frame timing
- 720p HD video recording at 60p (59.94 Hz) and 50p (50 Hz)
- 480p ED video recording at 30p and 25p
- Autofocus while recording video (absent from previous EOS 5D Mark III)
- Live View Continous AF for stills and Movie Servo AF while recording video (first introduced on the EOS M)
- 5.0 frames per second continuous shooting
- "Anti-flicker" feature (first introduced on the EOS 7D Mark II) – the shutter release can be set to compensate for flickering electric lighting
- ISO sensitivity 100–6400 (expandable to ISO 50–12800)
- 3.2″ Clear View II LCD screen with 1,040,000 dots resolution
- 61 points autofocus system, with 41 cross-type points
- 252 zones color-sensitive metering system
- EOS Scene Detection System with a new 150,000 pixels RGB + IR metering sensor
- Magnesium alloy body
- Weather sealing (resistance to water and dust)
- Wi-Fi for wireless file transfer (with W-E1 Wi-Fi Adapter in SD card-slot similar to the EOS 7D Mark II)
- Dual card slots: one CompactFlash (CF) with full UDMA support, and one SD (supports full UHS-I bus)
- New shutter and mirror mechanism to help reduce vibrations and camera shake
- Fine Detail – new Picture Style
- Time-lapse movie features
- 700 shot battery life (approx.)

Type	Sensor	Class	00	01	02	03	04	05	06	07	08	09	10	11	12	13	14	15	16	17	18	19	20	21	22	23	24	25	26
DSLR	Full-frame	Flagship				1Ds		1Ds Mk II			1Ds Mk III					1D C													
DSLR	Full-frame	Flagship				1Ds		1Ds Mk II			1Ds Mk III				1D X					1D X Mk II ^{T}			1D X Mk III ^{T}						
DSLR	APS-H	Flagship			1D			1D Mk II	1D Mk II N		1D Mk III		1D Mk IV																
DSLR	Full-frame	Professional																	5DS / 5DS R										
DSLR	Full-frame	Professional							5D			_{x} 5D Mk II			_{x} 5D Mk III					5D Mk IV ^{T}									
DSLR	Full-frame	Advanced														_{x} 6D					_{x} 6D Mk II ^{AT}								
DSLR	APS-C	Advanced											_{x} 7D					_{x} 7D Mk II											
DSLR	APS-C	Mid-range						20Da								_{x} 60Da ^{A}													
DSLR	APS-C	Mid-range		D30	D60	10D		20D	30D		40D	_{x} 50D		_{x} 60D ^{A}			_{x} 70D ^{AT}		80D ^{AT}				90D ^{AT}						
DSLR	APS-C	Mid-range																	760D ^{AT}		77D ^{AT}								
DSLR	APS-C	Entry-level					300D	350D		400D	450D	_{x} 500D	_{x} 550D	_{x} 600D ^{A}		_{x} 650D ^{AT}	_{x} 700D ^{AT}		_{x} 750D ^{AT}		800D ^{AT}			850D ^{AT}					
DSLR	APS-C	Entry-level															_{x} 100D ^{T}		_{x} 200D ^{AT}				250D ^{AT}						
DSLR	APS-C	Entry-level										1000D		_{x} 1100D			_{x} 1200D			1300D		2000D							
DSLR	APS-C	Value																				4000D							
Early models			Canon EOS DCS 5 (1995); Canon EOS DCS 3 (1995); Canon EOS DCS 1 (1995); Canon EOS D2000 (1998); Canon EOS D6000 (1998)																										
Type	Sensor	Spec																											
Type	Sensor	Spec	00	01	02	03	04	05	06	07	08	09	10	11	12	13	14	15	16	17	18	19	20	21	22	23	24	25	26
