= Digital Photo Professional =

Canon software

Digital Photo Professional (DPP)
- Screenshot of Canon DPP on OS X
- Developer: Canon
- Stable release: 4.20.11.0 / June 17, 2025; 10 months ago
- Operating system: Windows, Mac OS X, Linux
- Platform: (32-bit or 64-bit)
- License: Proprietary software
- Website: www.canon-europe.com/support/camera_software/#EOSDPP

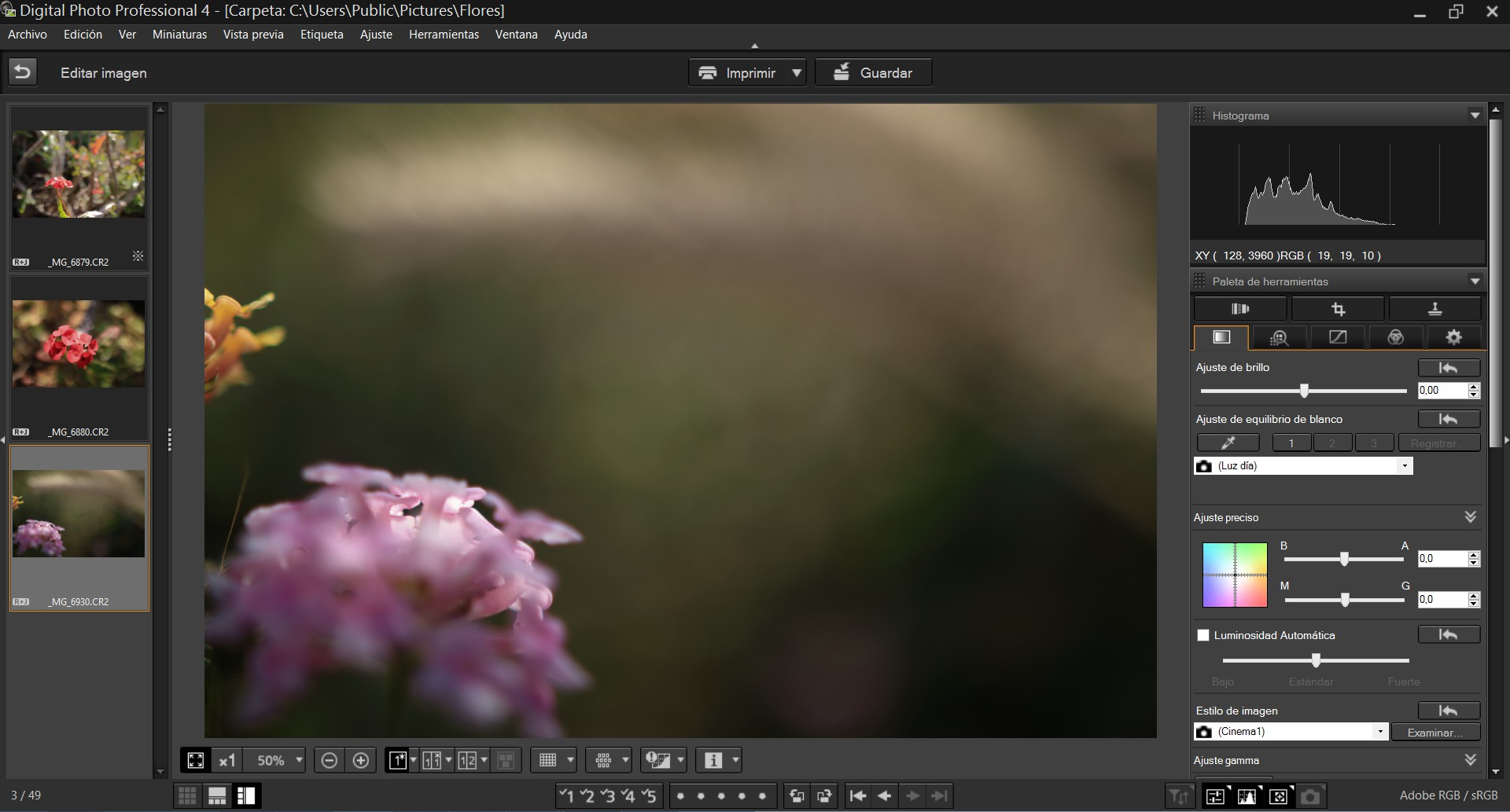
Screenshot of Canon DPP version 4.4.0 on Windows.

Digital Photo Professional (DPP) is the software that Canon ships with its digital SLR (and some of its compacts, e.g. the Canon PowerShot S90) cameras for editing and asset management of its Canon raw (.CR2) files. It can also work with the older .CRW format of selected models, and also JPEGs and TIFFs from any source. The full version ships on a CD with the camera, and updates can be downloaded from Canon's website. Even though officially DPP only supports Windows and Mac operating systems, it is possible to run DPP on Linux systems by using Wine.

== Editing tools ==
Basic editing tools in DPP include brightness, white balance and picture style adjustment and the adjustments for contrast, saturation and sharpness. There is also a noise reduction tool which has separate settings for luminance and chrominance noise. Lens aberration tool can be used for correcting the effects of physical lens imperfections like peripheral illumination, distortion and chromatic aberration. Aberration tool only works with RAW files that were taken with compatible cameras and lenses.

== See also ==
- Comparison of raster graphics editors
