= Expert Imaging and Sound Association =

- Logo of the Expert Imaging and Sound Association
- Abbreviation: EISA
- Formation: 1982
- President: Ljubiša Miodragović
- Website: eisa.eu
- Formerly called: European Imaging and Sound Association

The Expert Imaging and Sound Association (EISA) is an international collaboration of specialist consumer electronics magazines, websites and expert journalists that evaluates and recognizes excellence in audiovisual, imaging and consumer technology products.

== History ==
EISA was founded in 1982 by editors-in-chief from a small group of European photography magazines who came together to select a "Camera of the Year" based on rigorous independent testing. Out of this meeting the association evolved, formalizing as the European Imaging and Sound Association in 1989 as more publications joined.

Over the decades EISA expanded beyond European borders as additional member publications and websites joined from outside Europe, reflecting the globalization of consumer electronics and media. As part of this evolution, the acronym EISA was reinterpreted in 2018 to stand for Expert Imaging and Sound Association to emphasize its broader international membership and expertise.

The association's leadership includes a president and other officers drawn from its member media; historically, George Spinach, Jorge Goncalves and Paul Miller have been cited as EISA's presidents. The current president is Ljubiša Miodragović.

== Structure and membership ==
EISA consists of a community of specialist technology magazines, websites and journalists from a wide range of countries — recent counts suggest around 54 member publications from 27 countries, spanning Europe, North America, Australia, Asia and beyond.

Members are organized into Expert Groups that focus on specific product categories, including:

- Photography
- Hi-Fi
- Home Theatre & Vision
- Mobile Devices
- In-Car Electronics

Each Expert Group combines the independent testing and technical expertise of member publications to assess and debate products within its field.

== EISA Awards ==
One of EISA's central activities is its annual EISA Awards, which identify and honour the best new consumer electronics products released during the year. Winners are selected through a process in which member magazines nominate products based on their own independent testing, and these nominations are then discussed and voted on by the relevant Expert Group during a several-month judging period.

The awards cover multiple categories reflecting the breadth of modern consumer technology — from imaging and sound to mobile devices and in-car electronics — with winners announced each year in August. EISA winners are often promoted with a distinctive EISA Award logo and citation, recognized by both industry and consumers as a marker of excellence.

Annual events include EISA's product webinars, expert meetings and an awards gala ceremony attended by manufacturers and media representatives.
