= Technical Image Press Association =

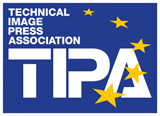
- Technical Image Press Association logo
- Abbreviation: TIPA
- Formation: April 16, 1991 (35 years ago)
- Founded at: Paris
- Type: International nongovernmental organization
- Purpose: Trade association
- Headquarters: Madrid, Spain
- Coordinates: 40.4501°N 3.7726°W
- Region served: Worldwide
- Members: Photography and imaging magazines
- Official language: English
- Chairman: Thomas Gerwers
- Main organ: Board of directors
- Website: tipa.com

The Technical Image Press Association (TIPA) is an international, non-profit association advocating the interests of the photography and imaging magazine-publishing industry.

The association represents 30 titles, published in eight European countries and seven non-European countries.

== History ==
The organization was established in 1991 as an association of European photography and imaging magazines. Since 2009, members have joined from outside of Europe.

== Activities ==
Each year, the editors of the member magazines vote for the best products introduced to the market during the previous twelve months, taking into account innovation, cutting-edge technology, design, ease-of-use and the price to performance ratio of the products.

TIPA held its annual awards ceremony every second year at photokina, a biennial trade fair for the photographic and imaging industries.

Since 2021 the awards have been at the PHOTOPIA Hamburg Festival of Imaging.

== Member magazines ==
The member magazines that form TIPA are:

- Camera – Australia
- FHOX – Brazil
- Photo Life – Canada
- Photo Solution – Canada
- Chinese Photography – China
- Fisheye – France
- Réponses Photo – France
- digit! – Germany
- Foto Hits Magazin – Germany
- INPHO Imaging and Business – Germany
- Photo Presse – Germany
- Photographie – Germany
- ProfiFoto – Germany
- Photo Business – Greece
- Photographos – Greece
- Fotó Magazin – Hungary
- Better Photography – India
- Fotografia Reflex – Italy
- FOTOgraphia – Italy
- Fotografie F+D – Netherlands
- Fotovisie – Netherlands
- P/f Professionele Fotografie – Netherlands
- PiX Magazine – South Africa
- FV / Foto-Vídeo Actualidad – Spain
- Digital Photo – United Kingdom
- Practical Photography – United Kingdom
- Professional Photo – United Kingdom
- pdn – United States
- Rangefinder – United States
- Shutterbug – United States

Affiliate member

- Camera Journal Press Club – Japan

== Administration ==
TIPA is supported by a board of directors and a secretariat based in Madrid, Spain. The board is elected by members at a general meeting held every year.

== See also ==
- Lists of magazines
