= Battery grip =

Camera accessory

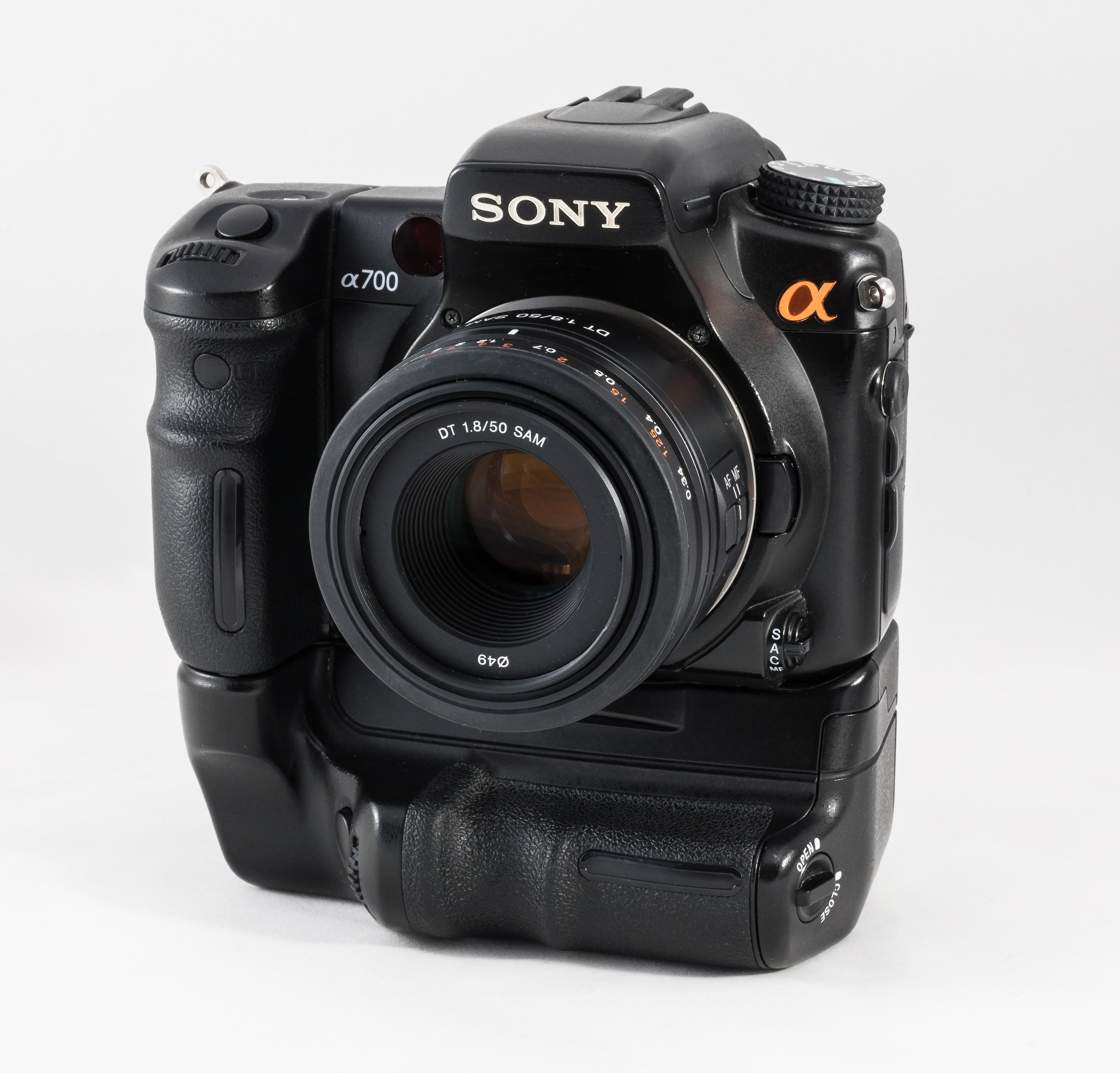
Sony Alpha 700 with battery grip N50

A battery grip (aka battery pack) is an accessory for an SLR/DSLR/MILC (and occasionally other cameras), which allows the camera to hold multiple batteries to extend the battery life of the camera, and adds a vertical grip facilitating the shooting of portrait photography. Although some are purely a battery grip, many grips include vertical camera controls. Some models may also feature a continuous shooting boost which increases the burst rate of the camera's shutter.

It usually attaches to the camera body through the camera's own battery compartment and provides a cassette to hold additional batteries to increase the battery life for the camera. Most battery grips also come with a second cassette allowing the photographer to shoot using multiple AA batteries.

Battery grips are usually designed to fit only one or a few specific camera models, since they must match the body's shape, connectors, and power requirements.
