= Cluster diagram =

A Cluster diagram or clustering diagram is a general type of diagram, which represents some kind of cluster. A cluster in general is a group or bunch of several discrete items that are close to each other.

The cluster diagram figures a cluster, such as a network diagram figures a network, a flow diagram a process or movement of objects, and a tree diagram an abstract tree. But all these diagrams can be considered interconnected: A network diagram can be seen as a special orderly arranged kind of cluster diagram. A cluster diagram is a mesh kind of network diagram. A flow diagram can be seen as a line type of network diagram, and a tree diagram a tree type of network diagram.

== Types of cluster diagrams ==
Specific types of cluster diagrams are:

Comparison diagram of sky scraper

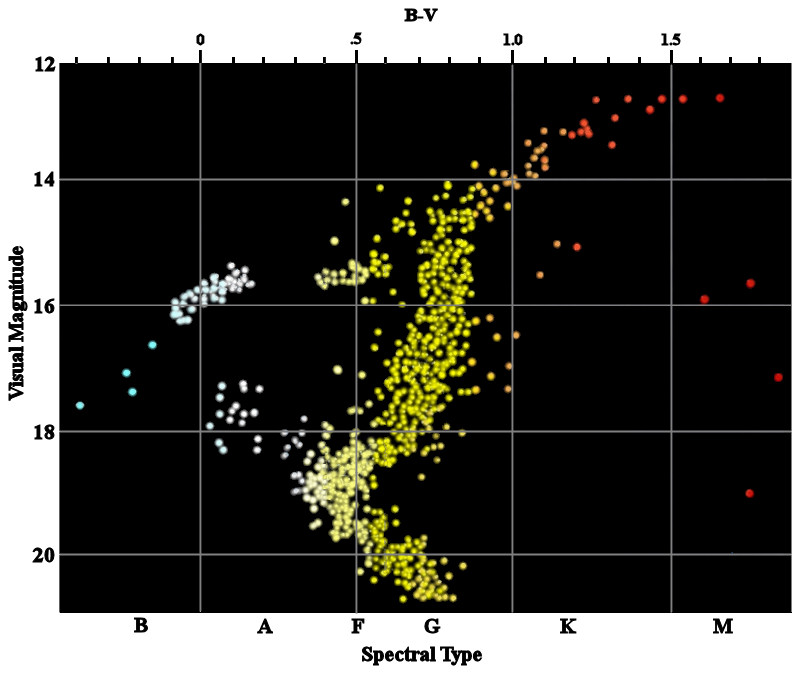
Astronomic cluster diagram of the Messier 3 globular cluster

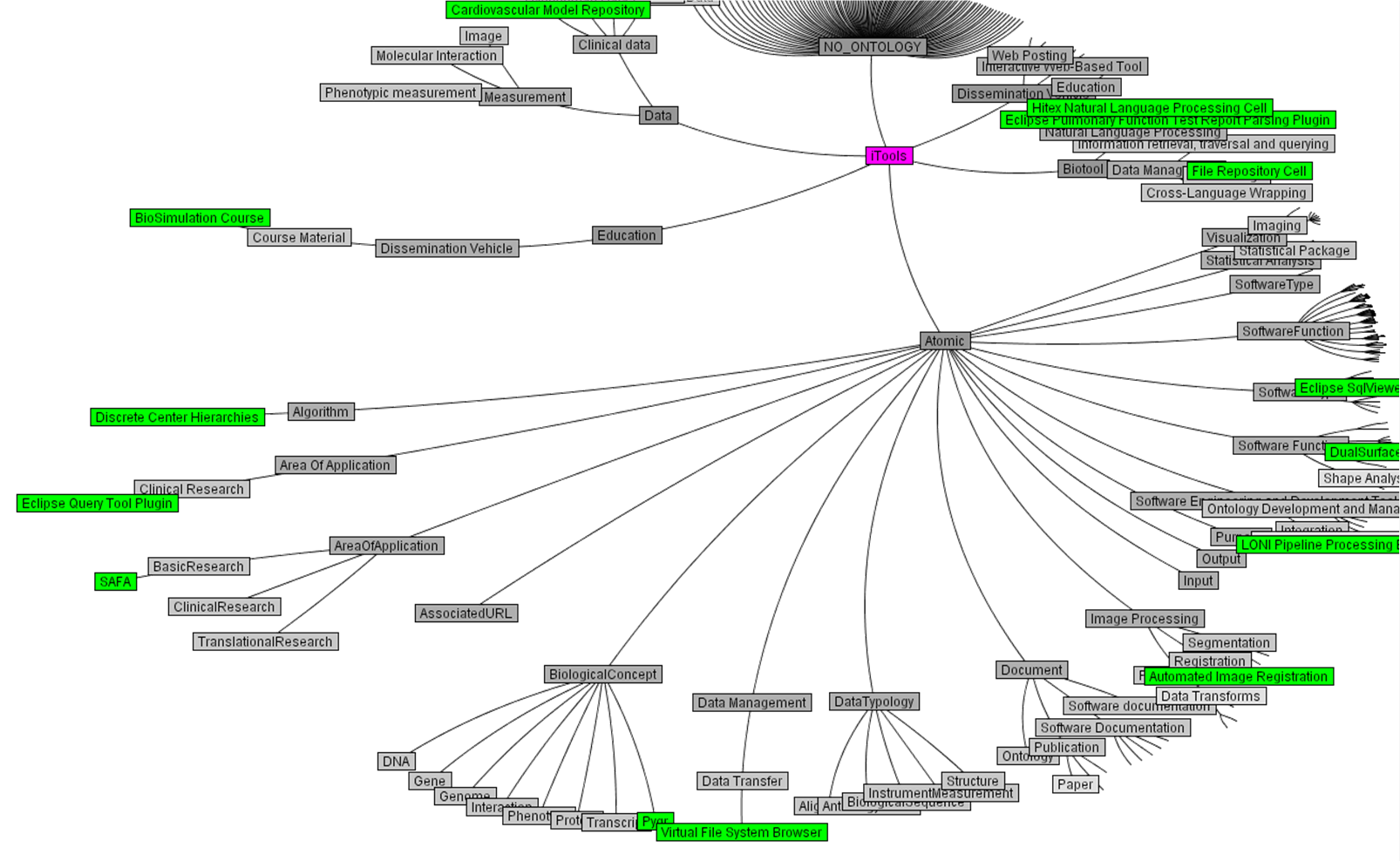
Biositemap diagram

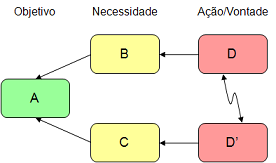
Cluster chart in brainstorming
- In architecture a comparison diagram is sometimes called a cluster diagram.
- In astronomy diagrams of star clusters, galaxy clusters or globular clusters.
- In brainstorming a cluster diagrams is also called cloud diagram. They can be considered "are a type of non-linear graphic organizer that can help to systematize the generation of ideas based upon a central topic. Using this type of diagram... can more easily brainstorm a theme, associate about an idea, or explore a new subject". Also, the term cluster diagrams is sometimes used as synonym of mind maps".

Computer architecture diagram of a PC

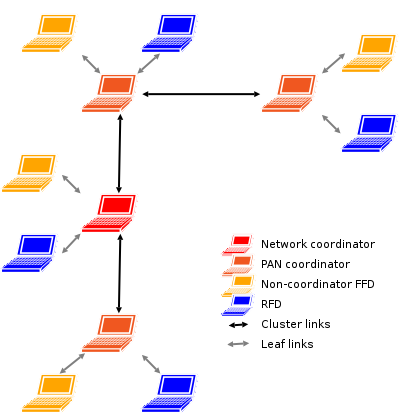
Computer network diagram

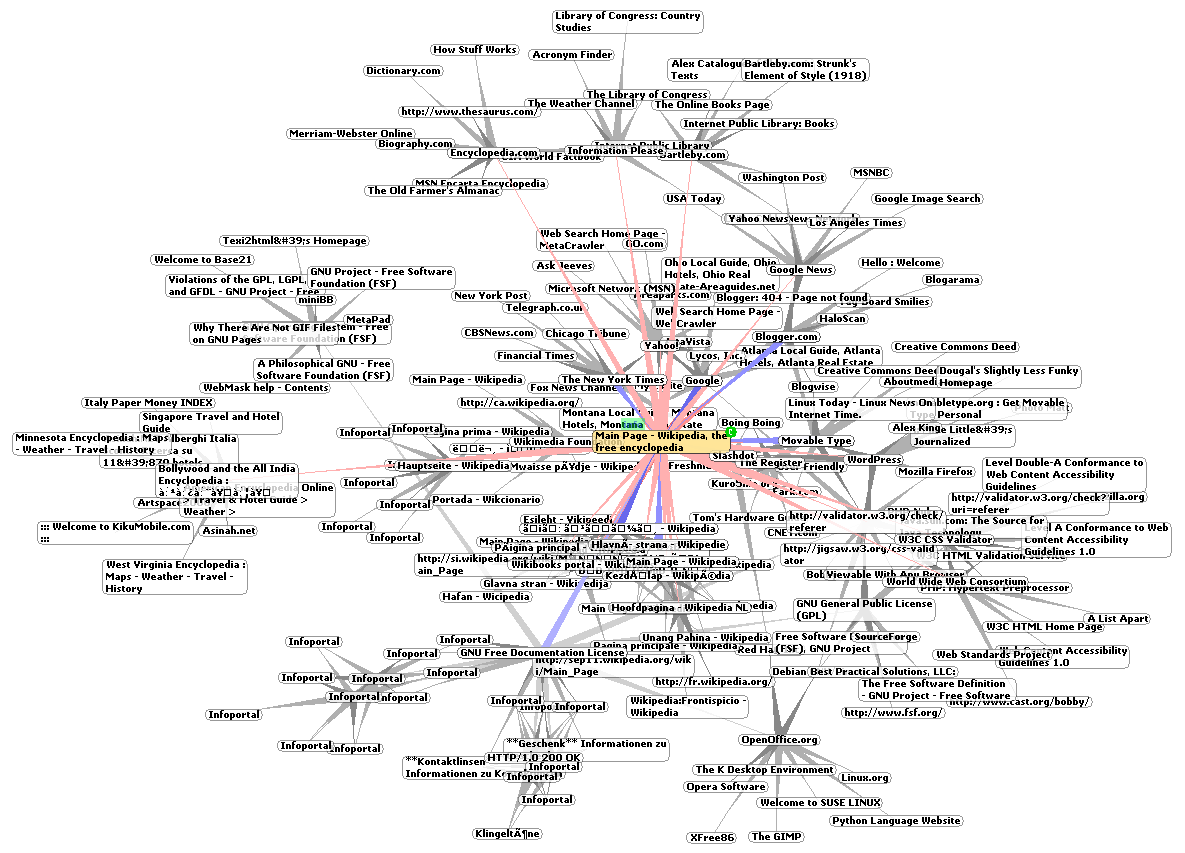
Internet diagram

System context diagram
- In computer science more complex diagrams of computer networks, computer architecture, file systems and internet can be considered cluster diagrams.
- In information visualization specific visual representation of large-scale collections of non-numerical information are sometimes drawn in the shape of a cluster diagram.
- In quantum field theory for example, according to Crawford (1998), the called coupled cluster diagram is a "simple diagrammatic formalism popularized by Kucharski and Bartlett [in 1986] by which one may construct the coupled cluster energy and amplitude equations far more quickly than by direct application of Wick's theorem".

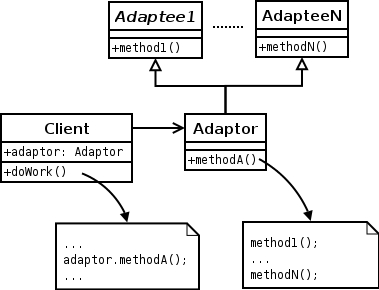
UML Class diagram

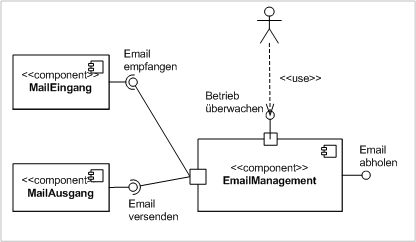
UML Component diagram

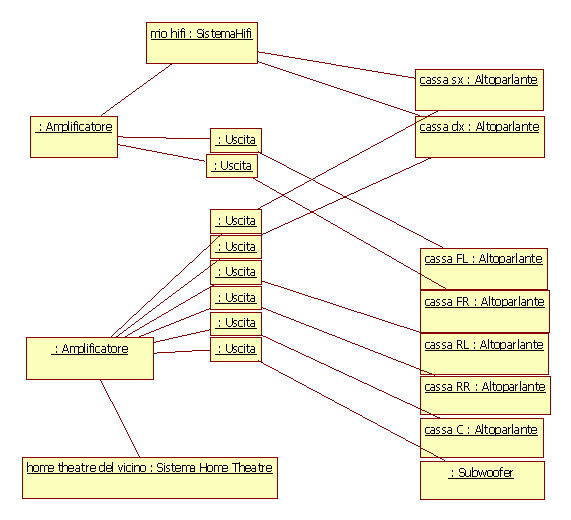
UML Composite structure diagram

UML Deployment diagram
- In the Unified Modeling Language (UML) all structure diagrams can be considered cluster diagrams. These structure diagrams emphasize what things must be in the system being modeled. UML encounters here the Class diagram, Component diagram, Composite structure diagram, Deployment diagram, Object diagram, and the Package diagram.

== See also ==
- Cluster graph
