= Real-Time UML =

Real-Time UML (RTUML) refers to the application of the Unified Modelling Language (UML) for the analysis, design, and implementation of real-time and embedded systems, where timing constraints, concurrency, and resource management are critical. It extends standard UML with profiles, notations, and semantics to handle hard and soft real-time requirements, such as modelling predictable response times and fault tolerance. RTUML is not a separate language but a methodology leveraging UML diagrams (e.g., statecharts, sequence diagrams) for time-sensitive applications like automotive controls, avionics, and medical devices.

The term is closely associated with Bruce Powel Douglass, who popularised it through his books and the Harmony process for embedded software development. As of 2025, RTUML remains relevant in industries requiring certified systems, though its adoption varies with agile methodologies and model-driven engineering tools.

== Background ==
Real-Time UML emerged in the late 1990s as UML was standardized by the Object Management Group (OMG) in 1997, addressing the need for object-oriented modeling in real-time systems previously dominated by procedural languages like C. Traditional real-time development relied on "bare metal" programming or theoretical models, but RTUML introduced visual notations for object structure, behaviour, and timing.

Bruce Powel Douglass’s 1999 book, Real-Time UML: Developing Efficient Objects for Embedded Systems, formalised the approach, emphasising statecharts for concurrency and timing constraints. Later editions (2004, 2006) incorporated UML 2.0 features like activity and timing diagrams, aligning with OMG’s Real-Time Profile (now part of MARTE—Modelling and Analysis of Real-Time and Embedded Systems). The Harmony process integrates RTUML with executable models for simulation and code generation.

RTUML addresses hard real-time systems (e.g., strict deadlines in avionics) versus soft real-time (e.g., media streaming), using UML extensions for schedulability analysis.

== Key concepts ==
RTUML adapts UML diagrams and techniques for real-time needs:

- Statecharts and Behaviour Modelling: Extended state machines model reactive behaviour, using and-states for concurrency, pseudostates for transitions, and timing constraints (e.g., {duration < 10ms}). Examples include cardiac pacemaker models.
- Sequence and Interaction Diagrams: Capture message timing, priorities, and resource allocation in multi-threaded systems.
- Architectural Patterns: Define logical and physical architectures with active objects for concurrency and patterns like observer or publisher-subscriber.
- Timing and Constraints: Use Object Constraint Language (OCL) for specifying deadlines and priorities.
- Profiles and Extensions: OMG’s UML Profile for Schedulability, Performance, and Time (SPT) and MARTE add stereotypes like RT::ActiveObject.

These support iterative development, from requirements to deployment, often with tools like IBM Rhapsody or Enterprise Architect.

== Applications ==
RTUML is used in:

- Embedded Systems: Modelling automotive ECUs or UAV controls.
- Avionics and Defence: DO-178C-compliant designs for fault tolerance.
- Medical Devices: Pacemakers or ventilators with precise timing.
- Industrial Automation: RTOS task visualisation via sequence diagrams.

Tools like IBM Rhapsody support RTUML for model-based development and code generation in C/C++.

== Criticism and adoption ==
RTUML’s complexity can overwhelm simple systems, and its use in agile environments is limited, where lightweight diagrams are preferred. Surveys indicate UML (including RTUML) is used in 30–50% of embedded projects, often for documentation rather than full model-driven engineering. It remains standard in academia and certified industries like aerospace.

== See also ==
- Unified Modeling Language
- Embedded system
- Real-time computing
- Model-driven engineering
