= Communication diagram =

Component of the Unified Modeling Language

Real life system design sample with the Communication diagram of UML

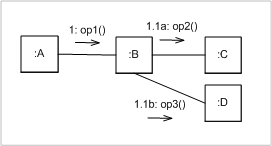
Generic sample of a Communication diagram

A communication diagram in Unified Modeling Language (UML) 2.5.1 is a simplified version of the UML 1.x collaboration diagram.

UML has four types of interaction diagrams:

- Sequence diagram
- Communication diagram
- Interaction overview diagram
- Timing diagram

A Communication diagram models the interactions between objects or parts in terms of sequenced messages. Communication diagrams represent a combination of information taken from Class, Sequence, and Use Case Diagrams describing both the static structure and dynamic behavior of a system.

However, communication diagrams use the free-form arrangement of objects and links as used in Object diagrams. In order to maintain the ordering of messages in such a free-form diagram, messages are labeled with a chronological number and placed near the link the message is sent over. Reading a communication diagram involves starting at message 1.0, and following the messages from object to object.

Communication diagrams show much of the same information as sequence diagrams, but because of how the information is presented, some of it is easier to find in one diagram than the other. Communication diagrams show which elements each one interacts with better, but sequence diagrams show the order in which the interactions take place more clearly.

== See also ==
- Data flow diagram
