= Mermaid (software) =

Diagramming and charting software

- Developers: Knut Sveidqvist and contributors
- Release: 2014; 12 years ago
- Written in: TypeScript, JavaScript
- Operating system: Cross-platform
- Type: Diagramming and charting
- License: MIT
- Website: mermaid.js.org
- Repository: github.com/mermaid-js/mermaid

Mermaid is an open-source JavaScript-based diagramming and charting software that generates diagrams from text-based descriptions. Created by Knut Sveidqvist in 2014, the project originated from a need to simplify diagram creation in documentation workflows after experiencing issues with proprietary software file formats.

== Features ==
Mermaid allows users to create various types of diagrams using a Markdown-like syntax, including:

- Flowcharts
- Sequence diagrams
- Class diagrams
- State diagrams
- Gantt charts
- Entity–relationship diagrams

The software provides both text-based and visual editing interfaces, allowing users to switch between the two modes. Users can create diagrams through the Mermaid Live Editor, a web-based tool that provides real-time preview capabilities without requiring local installation.

== History ==
Mermaid.js was created in 2014 by Swedish software architect Knut Sveidqvist to keep diagrams aligned with software documentation. Sveidqvist stated that the idea emerged after losing a Microsoft Visio file, which led him to pursue a text-based, Markdown-centric approach. The project name was inspired by The Little Mermaid, which his children were watching at the time.

The project's goal is to describe diagrams in plain text kept in version control, helping documentation keep pace with development and addressing "doc-rot." A guidebook on Mermaid, The Official Guide to Mermaid.js, was published in 2021.

In 2022, Sveidqvist co-founded Mermaid Chart Inc. (referred to as Mermaid), which offers hosted editing tools and enterprise features distinct from the open-source library. The company's hosted and enterprise offerings are proprietary open-core extensions, focusing on text-to-diagram workflows that support versioning, automation, and code review processes.

== Integration ==
Mermaid is supported natively by several platforms and services:

- Azure DevOps (in project wikis)
- GitHub (in Markdown files)
- Gitea
- GitLab
- Joplin
- Tuleap
- Notion
- Obsidian
- Quarto
- StarUML

== Development ==
As of 2024, the project is developed under both open-source and commercial models. The core functionality remains open-source under the MIT License, while a commercial offering called Mermaid Chart provides additional features and hosted services. The open-source project has garnered significant community engagement, with over 74,000 GitHub stars and 6,800 forks as of early 2025.

In March 2024, the commercial entity raised $7.5 million in seed funding from investors including Open Core Ventures, Sequoia, and Microsoft's M12 fund.

== Recognition ==
The project received the JS Open Source Award in 2019 for "The Most Exciting Use of Technology."

== See also ==
- PlantUML
- Graphviz
- Miro (collaboration platform)
- Microsoft Visio
- Lucidchart
- StarUML
