= Timing diagram =

Timing diagram may refer to:

- Digital timing diagram
- Timing diagram (Unified Modeling Language)
- Time–distance diagram
