= Computer component =

Computer component may refer to:

- Electronic components, the constituents of electronic circuits
- Software components in component-based software engineering
- Component (UML), a modular part of a system in the Unified Modeling Language
- Computer hardware, the physical components within a computer
