= CCSL (disambiguation) =

CCSL may refer to:

- Christ Church St. Laurence
- Council of Free Labour Unions
- Corpus Christianorum Series Latina
- Clock Constraints Specification Language, a computer language for modeling relations between clocks
