= Pinwheel scheduling =

An instance of the pinwheel scheduling problem: tasks A, B, and C have maximum repeat times 2, 4, and 5 respectively. The repeating schedule ABACABAC... solves this instance.

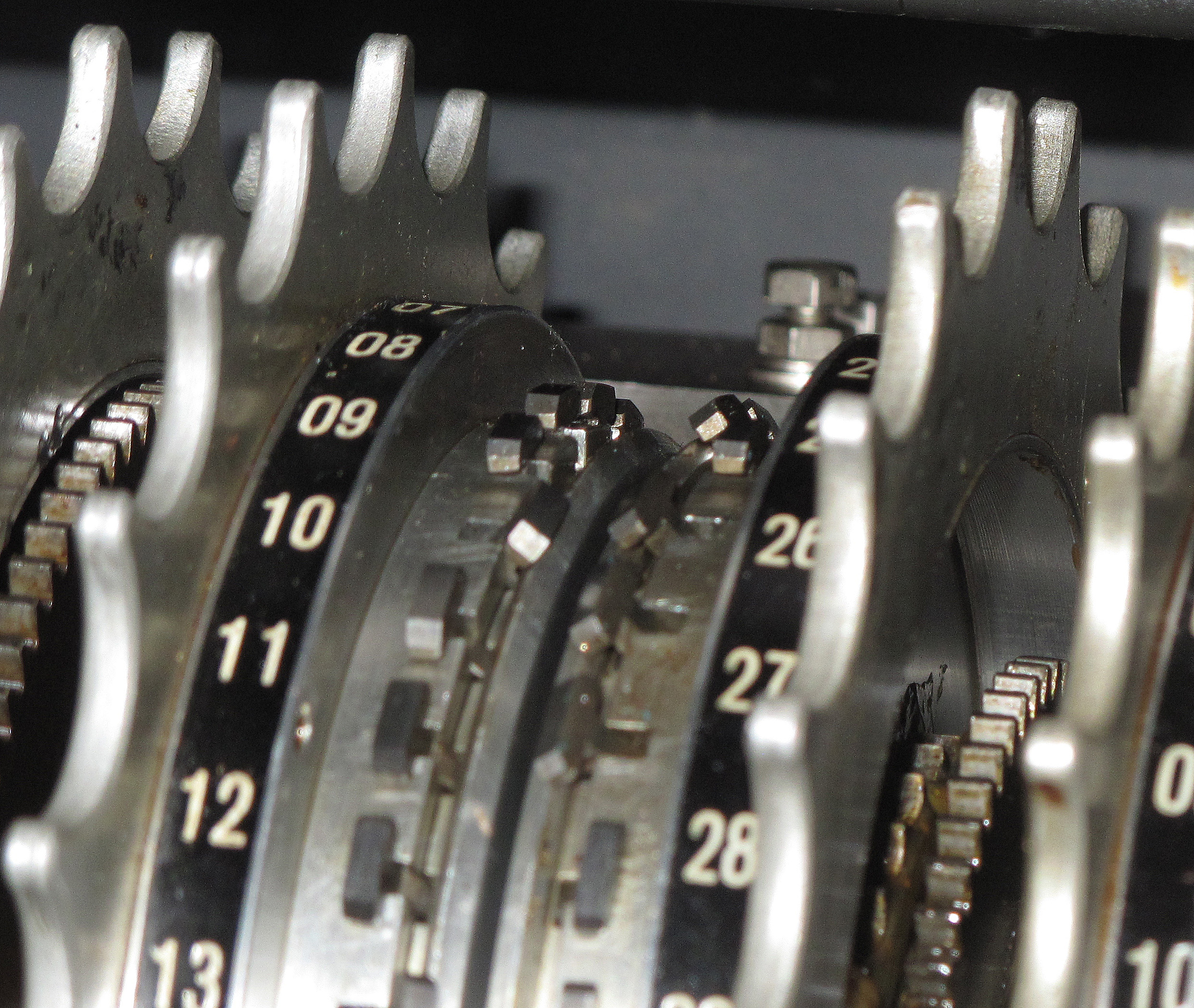
A pinwheel in a Lorenz SZ42 cipher machine with its pins (the small lugs near the center of the image) set to different positions

In mathematics and computer science, the pinwheel scheduling problem is a problem in real-time scheduling with repeating tasks of unit length and hard constraints on the time between repetitions.

When a pinwheel scheduling problem has a solution, it has one in which the schedule repeats periodically. This repeating pattern resembles the repeating pattern of set and unset pins on the gears of a pinwheel cipher machine, justifying the name. If the fraction of time that is required by each task totals less than 5/6 of the total time, a solution always exists, but some pinwheel scheduling problems whose tasks use a total of slightly more than 5/6 of the total time do not have solutions.

Certain formulations of the pinwheel scheduling problem are NP-hard.

== Definition ==
The input to pinwheel scheduling consists of a list of tasks, each of which is assumed to take unit time per instantiation. Each task has an associated positive integer value, its maximum repeat time (the maximum time from the start of one instantiation of the task to the next). Only one task can be performed at any given time.

The desired output is an infinite sequence specifying which task to perform in each unit of time. Each input task should appear infinitely often in the sequence, with the largest gap between two consecutive instantiations of a task at most equal to the repeat time of the task.

For example, the infinitely repeating sequence ABACABACABAC... would be a valid pinwheel schedule for three tasks A, B, and C with repeat times that are at least 2, 4, and 4 respectively.

== Density ==
If the task to be scheduled are numbered from $1$ to $n$, let $t_i$ denote the repeat time for task $i$. In any valid schedule, task $i$ must use a $1/t_i$ fraction of the total time, the amount that would be used in a schedule that repeats that task at exactly its specified repeat time. The density of a pinwheel scheduling problem is defined as the sum of these fractions, $\textstyle\sum 1/t_i$. For a solution to exist, the times devoted to each task cannot sum to more than the total available time, so it is necessary for the density to be at most $1$.

This condition on density is also sufficient for a schedule to exist in the special case that all repeat times are multiples of each other. For instance, this would be true when all repeat times are powers of two. In this case one can solve the problem using a disjoint covering system. Having density at most $1$ is also sufficient when there are exactly two distinct repeat times. However, having density at most 1 is not sufficient in some other cases. In particular, there is no schedule for three items with repeat times $t_1=2$, $t_2=3$, and $t_3$, no matter how large $t_3$ may be, even though the density of this system is only $5/6 + 1/t_3$.

In 1993, it was conjectured that, when the density of a pinwheel scheduling is at most $5/6$, a solution exists. This was proven in 2024.

== Periodicity and complexity ==
When a solution exists, it can be assumed to be periodic, with a period at most equal to the product of the repeat times. However, it is not always possible to find a repeating schedule of sub-exponential length.

With a compact input representation that specifies, for each distinct repeat time, the number of objects that have that repeat time, pinwheel scheduling is NP-hard.

== Algorithms ==
Despite the NP-hardness of the pinwheel scheduling problem for general inputs, some types of inputs can be scheduled efficiently. An example of this occurs for inputs where (when listed in sorted order) each repeat time evenly divides the next one, and the density is at most one. In this case, the problem can be solved by a greedy algorithm that schedules the tasks in sorted order, scheduling each task to repeat at exactly its repeat time. At each step in this algorithm, the time slots that have already been assigned form a repeating sequence, with period equal to the repeat time of the most recently-scheduled task. This pattern allows each successive task to be scheduled greedily, maintaining the same invariant.

The same idea can be used for arbitrary instances with density at most 1/2, by rounding down each repeat time to a power of two that is less than or equal to it. This rounding process at most doubles the density, keeping it at most one. After rounding, all densities are multiples of each other, allowing the greedy algorithm to work. The resulting schedule repeats each task at its rounded repeat time; because these rounded times do not exceed the input times, the schedule is valid. Instead of rounding to powers of two, a greater density threshold can be achieved by rounding to other sequences of multiples, such as the numbers of the form $x\cdot 2^i$ for a careful choice of the coefficient $x$, or by rounding to two different geometric series and generalizing the idea that tasks with two distinct repeat times can be scheduled up to density one.

== Applications ==
The original work on pinwheel scheduling proposed it for an application in which a single base station must communicate with multiple satellites or remote sensors, one at a time, with distinct communications requirements. In this application, each satellite becomes a task in a pinwheel scheduling problem, with a repeat time chosen to give it adequate bandwidth. The resulting schedule is used to assign time slots for each satellite to communicate with the base station.

Other applications of pinwheel scheduling include scheduling maintenance sessions for a collection of objects (such as oil changes for automobiles), the arrangement of repeated symbols on the print chains of line printers, computer processing of multimedia data, and contention resolution in real-time wireless computer networks.
