= WCET =

WCET may refer to:

- Worst-case execution time, in computer science
- WCET (TV), a PBS station serving the Cincinnati area
- WICHE Cooperative for Educational Telecommunications, a project of the Western Interstate Commission for Higher Education
