= Dependency (UML) =

In the Unified Modeling Language (UML), a Dependency is "a Relationship that signifies that a single model Element or a set of model Elements requires other model Elements for their specification or implementation." "This means that the complete semantics of the client Element(s) are either semantically or structurally dependent on the definition of the supplier Element(s)." Two or more elements in this relationship are called tuples.

In UML, this is indicated by a dashed line pointing from the dependent (or client) to the independent (or supplier) element. The arrow representing a Dependency specifies the direction of a relationship, not the direction of a process.

== Standard predefined dependencies ==
UML - defined dependencies include:

- «call» UML2: The client (an operation) may call the supplier (an operation)
- «create» UML2: The client (a classifier) may create instances of the supplier (a classifier)
- «derive» UML2: The client (e.g., attribute value, link) may be computed from the supplier(s)
- «instantiate» UML2: Operations of the client (a classifier) may create instances of the supplier (a classifier)
- «permit» UML2: Obsolete
- «realize» UML2: Obsolete
- «refine» UML2: The client element(s) are at a "later" semantic level than the supplier(s)
- «send» UML2: The client (an operation) sends the supplier (a signal)
- «substitute» UML2: The client element can replace (under some circumstances) the supplier
- «trace» UML2: The client elements "trace" to the suppliers. Typically used for levels of requirements
- «use» UML2: The client element somehow "uses" the supplier

== Differences with UML link ==
A UML link is a run-time relationship between instances of classifiers, while a dependency is a model-time relationship between definitions.

A typical uni-directional link requires the one instance to know about, and thus depend, upon the other, but this is not required. A uni-directional link only requires the possibility of navigation not dependency.

Likewise, a bi-directional link requires that both instances may traverse to each other, but this also does not require dependency.

However, after the traversal of the association, if some property of the target instance's definition is accessed, such as an operation or attribute, a dependency is created.

== See also ==
- Coupling (computer programming)
- functional dependency
