= Composite structure diagram =

Type of static structure diagram

Composite structure diagram in the Unified Modeling Language (UML) is a type of static structure diagram that shows the internal structure of a class and the collaborations that this structure makes possible.

This diagram can include internal parts, ports through which the parts interact with each other or through which instances of the class interact with the parts and with the outside world, and connectors between parts or ports. A composite structure is a set of interconnected elements that collaborate at runtime to achieve some purpose. Each element has some defined role in the collaboration.

== Concepts ==
The key composite structure entities identified in the UML 2.0 specification are structured classifiers, parts, ports, connectors, and collaborations.

- Part : A part represents a role played at runtime by one instance of a classifier or by a collection of instances. The part may only name the role, it may name an abstract superclass, or it may name a specific concrete class. The part can include a multiplicity factor, such as the [0..*] shown for Viewer in the diagram.
- Port : A port is an interaction point that can be used to connect structured classifiers with their parts and with the environment. Ports can optionally specify the services they provide and the services they require from other parts of the system. In the diagram, each of the small squares is a port. Each port has a type and is labelled with a name, such as "var", "indVar1", or "view" in the diagram. Ports may contain a multiplicity factor, for example [3].

Ports can either delegate received requests to internal parts, or they can deliver these directly to the behavior of the structured classifier that the port is contained within. Public ports that are visible in the environment are shown straddling the boundary, while protected ports that are not visible in the environment are shown inside the boundary. All the ports in the diagram are public, except for the view port along the right boundary of FibonacciSystem.

- Connector : A connector binds two or more entities together, allowing them to interact at runtime. The connector is shown as a line between some combination of parts, ports and structured classifiers. The diagram shows three connectors between ports, and one connector between a structured classifier and a part.
- Collaboration : A collaboration is generally more abstract than a structured classifier. It is shown as a dotted oval containing roles that instances can play in the collaboration.
- Structured classifier : A StructuredClassifier represents a class, often an abstract class, whose behavior can be completely or partially described through interactions between parts.
- Encapsulated classifier : An EncapsulatedClassifier is a type of structured classifier that contains ports. In the diagram below, both FibonacciSystem and Variable are encapsulated classifiers because they both have ports along their boundaries.

== Examples ==
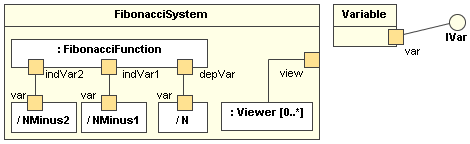
UML 2.0 composite structure diagram.

As an example, consider one possible way of modeling production of the Fibonacci sequence.

This UML 2.0 composite structure diagram specifies that instances of the 'FibonacciSystem' class are composed of a number of parts. The topmost of these parts is identified as having the classifier 'FibonacciFunction'. Three of the parts are identified by the role they play within instances of FibonacciSystem - the NMinus2 role, the NMinus1 role, and the N role. The fifth part, identified by its classifier Viewer, includes a multiplicity specification. At runtime there can be 0 or more instances of Viewer or some concrete subclass of Viewer.

At runtime the class instances that implement these three roles must provide the services specified by the IVar interface through their var ports. One such class is Variable, shown on the diagram with a port named var of type Var that realizes the IVar interface.

The port named "view" is a non-public port that can be used by an instance of FibonacciSystem to access the optional instance(s) of Viewer.
