= Component diagram =

Diagram depicting how components are wired together to form software systems

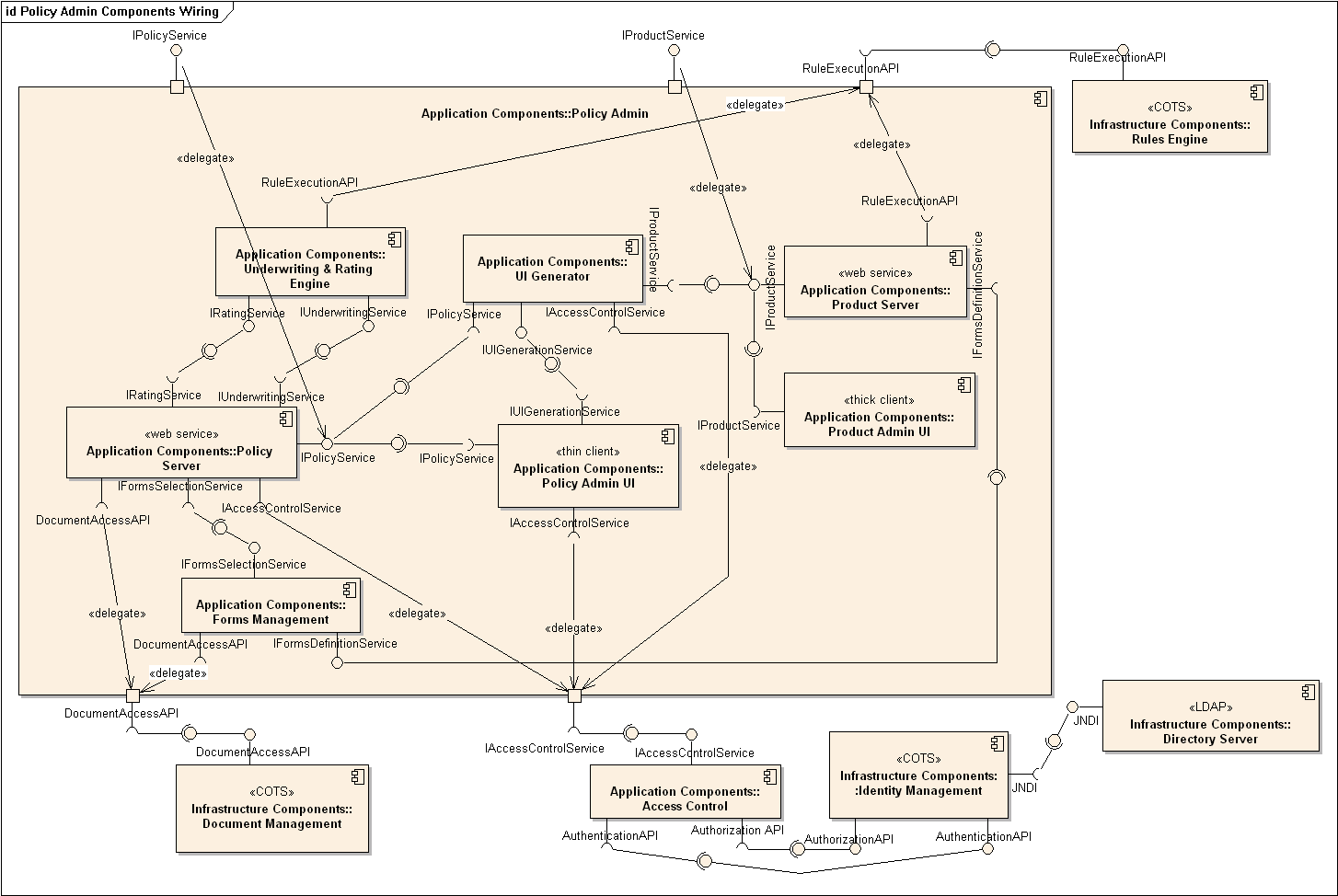
Component Diagram of an Insurance Policy Administration System

In Unified Modeling Language (UML), a component diagram depicts how components are wired together to form larger components or software systems. They are used to illustrate the structure of arbitrarily complex systems.

== Overview ==
A component diagram allows verification that a system's required functionality is acceptable. These diagrams are also used as a communication tool between the developer and stakeholders of the system. Programmers and developers use the diagrams to formalize a roadmap for the implementation, allowing for better decision-making about task assignment or needed skill improvements. System administrators can use component diagrams to plan ahead, using the view of the logical software components and their relationships on the system.

== Diagram elements ==
The component diagram extends the information given in a component notation element. One way of illustrating a component's provided and required interfaces is through a rectangular compartment attached to the component element. Another accepted way of presenting the interfaces is the ball-and-socket graphic convention. A provided dependency from a component to an interface is illustrated with a solid line to the component using the interface from a "lollipop", or ball, labelled with the name of the interface. A required usage dependency from a component to an interface is illustrated by a half-circle, or "socket", labelled with the name of the interface, attached by a solid line to the component that requires this interface. Inherited interfaces may be shown with a lollipop, preceding the name label with a "caret symbol". To illustrate dependencies between the two, use a "solid line" with an "open arrowhead" joining the socket to the lollipop.
