= Pinwheel (cryptography) =

Cryptographic device

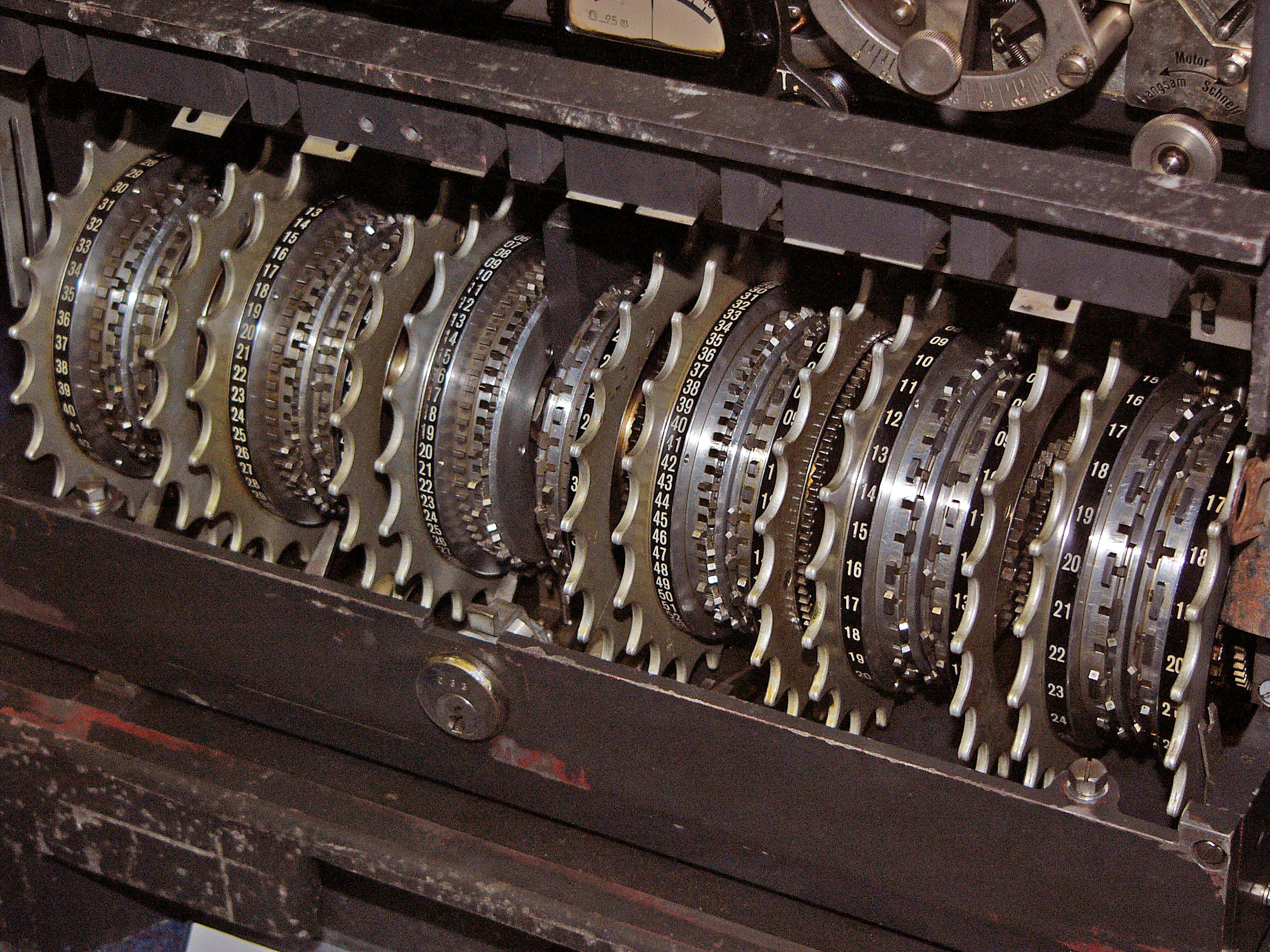
The German Lorenz SZ 42 cipher machine contained 12 pinwheels, with a total of 501 pins

In cryptography, a pinwheel was a device for producing a short pseudorandom sequence of bits (determined by the machine's initial settings), as a component in a cipher machine. A pinwheel consisted of a rotating wheel with a certain number of positions on its periphery. Each position had a "pin", "cam" or "lug" which could be either "set" or "unset". As the wheel rotated, each of these pins would in turn affect other parts of the machine, producing a series of "on" or "off" pulses which would repeat after one full rotation of the wheel. If the machine contained more than one wheel, usually their periods would be relatively prime to maximize the combined period. Pinwheels might be turned through a purely mechanical action (as in the M-209) or electromechanically (as in the Lorenz SZ 40/42).

== Development ==
The Swedish engineer Boris Caesar Wilhelm Hagelin is credited with having invented the first pinwheel device in 1925. He developed the machine while employed by Emanuel Nobel to oversee the Nobel interests in Aktiebolaget Cryptograph. He was the nephew of the founder of the Nobel Prize. The device was later introduced in France and Hagelin was awarded the French order of merit, Legion d'Honneur, for his work. One of the earliest cipher machines that Hagaelin developed was the C-38 and was later improved into the more portable Hagelin m-209. The M-209 is composed of a set of pinwheels and a rotating cage.

Other cipher machines which used pinwheels include the C-52, the CD-57 and the Siemens and Halske T52.

Pinwheels can be viewed as a predecessor to the electronic linear-feedback shift register (LFSR), used in later cryptosystems.

== See also ==
- Rotor machine
