= Profile diagram =

Software structure diagram

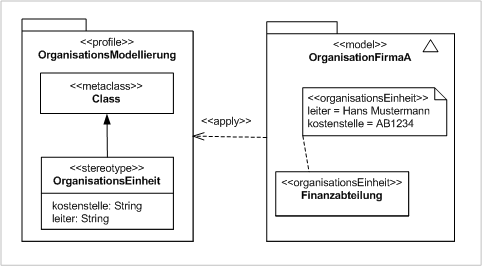
Example for the definition and usage of a simplified profile for organisation modelling purposes.

In Unified Modeling Language in the field of software engineering, a profile diagram operates at the metamodel level to show stereotypes as classes with the «stereotype» stereotype, and profiles as packages with the «profile» stereotype. The extension relation (solid line with closed, filled arrowhead) indicates what metamodel element a given stereotype is extending.

== History ==
The profile diagram did not exist in UML 1. Other diagrams had been used to display this issue. It was introduced with UML 2 to display the usage of profiles.

== See also ==
- UML diagrams
