= Object diagram =

Diagram showing the structure of objects in a system

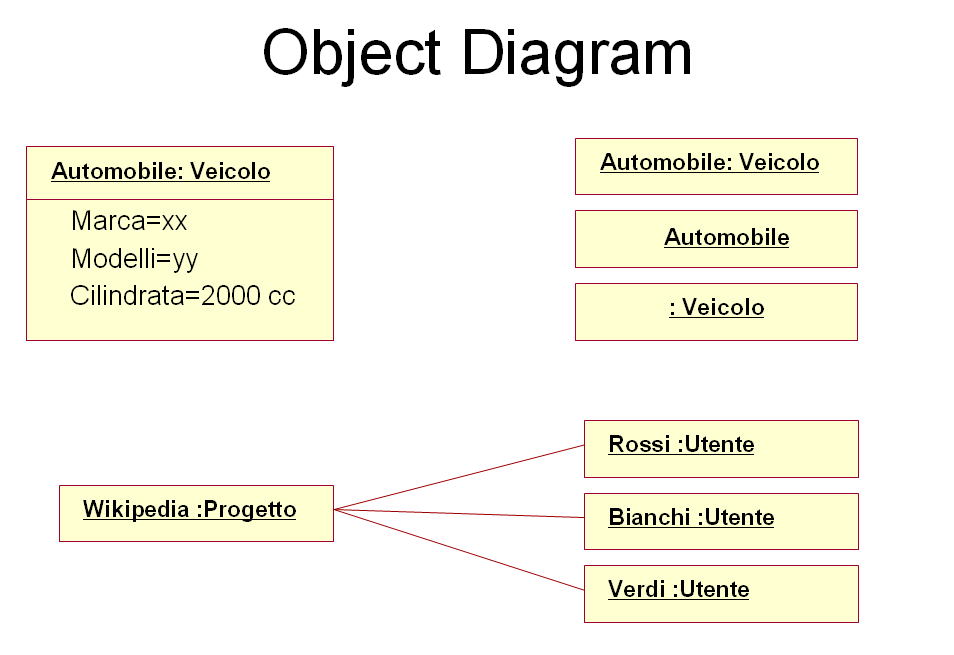
Example of an object diagram.

In object-oriented programming, an object diagram in the Unified Modeling Language (UML) is a diagram that shows a complete or partial view of the structure of a modeled system at a specific time.

== Overview ==
In the Unified Modeling Language (UML), an object diagram focuses on some particular set of objects and attributes, and the links between these instances. A correlated set of object diagrams provides insight into how an arbitrary view of a system is expected to evolve over time. Early UML specifications described object diagrams as such:

"An object diagram is a graph of instances, including objects and data values. A static object diagram is an instance of a class diagram; it shows a snapshot of the detailed state of a system at a point in time. The use of object diagrams is fairly limited, namely to show examples of data structure."

The latest UML 2.5.1 specification does not explicitly define object diagrams, but provides a notation for "instances" of classifiers.

Object diagrams and class diagrams are closely related and use almost identical notation. Both diagrams are meant to visualize static structure of a system. While class diagrams show classes, object diagrams display instances of classes (objects). Object diagrams are more concrete than class diagrams. They are often used to provide examples or act as test cases for class diagrams. Only aspects of current interest in a model are typically shown on an object diagram.

== Object diagram topics ==
=== Instance specifications ===
Each object and link on an object diagram is represented by an InstanceSpecification. This can show an object's classifier (e.g. an abstract or concrete class) and instance name, as well as attributes and other structural features using slots. Each slot corresponds to a single attribute or feature, and may include a value for that entity.

The name on an instance specification optionally shows an instance name, a ':' separator, and optionally one or more classifier names separated by commas. The contents of slots, if any, are included below the names, in a separate attribute compartment. A link is shown as a solid line, and represents an instance of an association.

=== Object diagram example ===
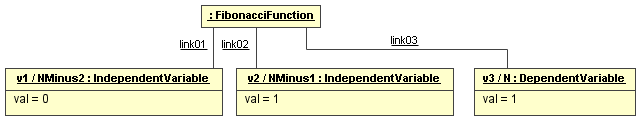
Initially, when n=2, and f(n-2) = 0, and f(n-1) = 1, then f(n) = 0 + 1 = 1.

Consider one possible way of modeling production of the Fibonacci sequence.

In the first UML object diagram on the right, the instance in the leftmost instance specification is named v1, has IndependentVariable as its classifier, plays the NMinus2 role within the FibonacciSystem, and has a slot for the val attribute with a value of 0. The second object is named v2, is of class IndependentVariable, plays the NMinus1 role, and has val = 1. The DependentVariable object is named v3, and plays the N role. The topmost instance, an anonymous instance specification, has FibonacciFunction as its classifier, and may have an instance name, a role, and slots, but these are not shown here. The diagram also includes three named links, shown as lines. Links are instances of an association.

After the first iteration, when n = 3, and f(n-2) = 1, and f(n-1) = 1, then f(n) = 1 + 1 = 2.

In the second diagram, at a slightly later point in time, the IndependentVariable and DependentVariable objects are the same, but the slots for the val attribute have different values. The role names are not shown here.

After several more iterations, when n = 7, and f(n-2) = 5, and f(n-1) = 8, then f(n) = 5 + 8 = 13.

In the last object diagram, a still later snapshot, the same three objects are involved. Their slots have different values. The instance and role names are not shown here.

=== Usage ===
If you are using a UML modeling tool, you will typically draw object diagrams using some other diagram type, such as on a class diagram. An object instance may be called an instance specification or just an instance. A link between instances is generally referred to as a link. Other UML entities, such as an aggregation or composition symbol (a diamond) may also appear on an object diagram.

== See also ==
- Object graph
