= Node (UML) =

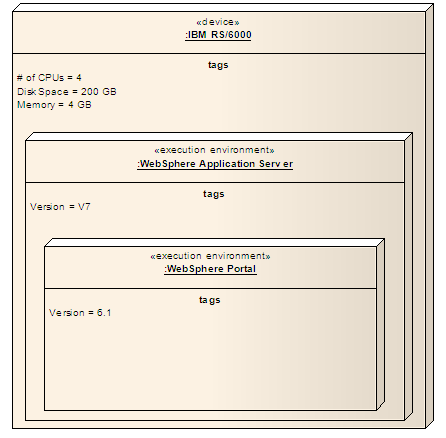
Two execution environments instances nested in a device instance

A node in the Unified Modeling Language (UML) is a computational resource upon which UML artifacts may be deployed for execution.

There are two types of nodes: device nodes and execution environments.

- A device represents hardware devices: a physical computational resource with processing capability upon which UML artifacts may be deployed for execution. Devices may be complex (i.e., they may consist of other devices).
- An execution environment represents software containers (such as operating systems, JVM, servlet/EJB containers, application servers, portal servers, etc.) This is a node that offers an execution environment for specific types of components that are deployed on it in the form of deployable artifacts.

Execution environments can be nested. Nodes can be interconnected through communication paths to define network structures. A communication path is an "association between two DeploymentTargets, through which they are able to exchange signals and messages".

== Usage ==
When modeling devices, it is possible to model them in several different ways:

- Name a device using the type and make, for instance "IBM RS6000", "HP 9000".
- Name a device using its intended function, for instance "Database Server", "High Speed Switch"
- Name a device using the operating system deployed on it, for instance "Linux Server", "Solaris Server".

Use tagged values to specify characteristics of devices / execution environments, for instance "Memory=2GB", "Disk Space=32GB", "Version=2.5.1".
