= Timing diagram (Unified Modeling Language) =

A timing diagram in Unified Modeling Language 2.5.1 is a specific type of interaction diagram, where the focus is on timing constraints.

Timing diagrams are used to explore the behaviors of objects throughout a given period of time. A timing diagram is a special form of a sequence diagram. The differences between timing diagram and sequence diagram are the axes are reversed so that the time increases from left to right and the lifelines are shown in separate compartments arranged vertically.

There are two basic flavors of timing diagram: the concise notation, and the robust notation .
