= Class diagram =

Diagram that describes the static structure of a software system

Hierarchy of UML 2.5 Diagrams, shown as a class diagram. The individual classes are represented just with one compartment, but they often contain up to three compartments.

In software engineering, a class diagram in the Unified Modeling Language (UML) is a type of static structure diagram that describes the structure of a system by showing the system's classes, their attributes, operations (or methods), and the relationships among objects.

The class diagram is the main building block of object-oriented modeling. It is used for general conceptual modeling of the structure of the application, and for detailed modeling, translating the models into programming code. Class diagrams can also be used for data modeling. The classes in a class diagram represent both the main elements, interactions in the application, and the classes to be programmed.

In the diagram, classes are represented with boxes that contain three compartments:

- The top compartment contains the name of the class. It is printed in bold and centered, and the first letter is capitalized.
- The middle compartment contains the attributes of the class. They are left-aligned and the first letter is lowercase.
- The bottom compartment contains the operations the class can execute. They are also left-aligned and the first letter is lowercase.

A class with three compartments

In the design of a system, a number of classes are identified and grouped together in a class diagram that helps to determine the static relations between them. In detailed modeling, the classes of the conceptual design are often split into subclasses.

In order to further describe the behavior of systems, these class diagrams can be complemented by a state diagram or UML state machine.

== Members ==
UML provides mechanisms to represent class members, such as attributes and methods, and additional information about them like constructors.

=== Visibility ===
To specify the visibility of a class member (i.e. any attribute or method), these notations must be placed before the members' name:

+	Public
-	Private
#	Protected
~	Package

A derived property is a property whose value (or values) is produced or computed from other information, for example, by using values of other properties.

A derived property is shown with its name preceded by a forward slash '/'.

=== Scope ===
The UML specifies two types of scope for members: instance and class. The class name appears an underlined concatenation of the instance name (if any), a colon (':'), and the actual class name.

- **Instance members** are scoped to a specific instance.
  - Attribute values may vary between instances
  - Method invocation may affect the instance's state (i.e. change instance's attributes)
- **Class members** are commonly recognized as "static" in many programming languages. The scope end is the class itself.
  - Attribute values are equal for all instances
  - Method invocation does not affect the classifier's state

To indicate a classifier scope for a member, its name must be underlined. Otherwise, instance scope is assumed by default.

== Relationships ==
UML relations notation

A relationship is a general term covering the specific types of logical connections found on class and object diagrams. UML defines the following relationships:

=== Instance-level relationships ===
==== Dependency ====
A dependency is a type of association where there is a semantic connection between dependent and independent model elements. It exists between two elements if changes to the definition of one element (the server or target) may cause changes to the other (the client or source). This association is uni-directional. A dependency is displayed as a dashed line with an open arrow that points from the client to the supplier.

==== Association ====
Class diagram example of association between two classes

An association represents a family of structural links. A binary association is represented as a solid line between two classes. A reflexive association is a binary association between the class and itself. An association between more than two classes is represented as a diamond connected with a solid line to each of the associated classes. An association between three classes is a ternary association. An association between more classes is called an n-ary association.

An association can be named, and the ends of an association can be adorned with role names, aggregation indicators, multiplicity, visibility, navigability and other properties. The dot notation for example allows to represent with a little dot on the side of one class that the association end is owned by the other side.

There are three types of association: simple association, shared aggregation, composite aggregation (composition). An association can be navigable in one or more directions. The navigability does not have to be explicitly specified. An open-headed arrow on the side of a class documents that the class can be reached efficiently at run-time from the opposite side. A unidirectional navigation is shown with a little cross on the association line on the side of the class that cannot be reached. For instance, a flight class is associated with a plane class bi-directionally.

==== Aggregation ====
Class diagram showing Aggregation between two classes. Here, a Professor 'has a' class to teach.

Aggregation is a variant of the "has a" association relationship; aggregation is more specific than association. It is an association that represents a part-whole or part-of relationship. As shown in the image, a Professor 'has a' class to teach. As a type of association, an aggregation can be named and have the same adornments that an association can. However, an aggregation may not involve more than two classes; it must be a binary association. Furthermore, there is hardly a difference between aggregations and associations during implementation, and the diagram may skip aggregation relations altogether.

Aggregation can occur when a class is a collection or container of other classes, but the contained classes do not have a strong lifecycle dependency on the container. The contents of the container still exist when the container is destroyed.

In UML, it is graphically represented as a hollow diamond shape on the containing class with a single line that connects it to the contained class. The aggregate is semantically an extended object that is treated as a unit in many operations, although physically it is made of several lesser objects.

==== Composition ====
Two class diagrams. The diagram on top shows Composition between two classes: A Car has exactly one Carburetor, and a Carburetor is a part of one Car. Carburetors cannot exist as separate parts, detached from a specific car. The diagram on bottom shows Aggregation between two classes: A Pond has zero or more Ducks, and a Duck has at most one Pond (at a time). Duck can exist separately from a Pond, e.g. it can live near a lake. When we destroy a Pond we usually do not kill all the Ducks.

The composite aggregation (colloquially called composition) relationship is a stronger form of aggregation where the aggregate controls the lifecycle of the elements it aggregates. The graphical representation is a filled diamond shape on the containing class end of the line that connect contained class(es) to the containing class.

==== Differences between Composition and Aggregation ====
Composition relationship
1. When attempting to represent real-world whole-part relationships, e.g. an engine is a part of a car.
2. When the container is destroyed, the contents are also destroyed, e.g. a university and its departments.

Aggregation relationship
1. When representing a software or database relationship, e.g. car model engine ENG01 is part of a car model CM01, as the engine, ENG01, maybe also part of a different car model.
2. When the container is destroyed, the contents are usually not destroyed, e.g. a professor has students; when the professor leaves the university the students do not leave along with the professor.

Thus the aggregation relationship is often "catalog" containment to distinguish it from composition's "physical" containment. UML 2 does not specify any semantic for the aggregation compared to the simple association.

=== Class-level relationships ===
==== Generalization/Inheritance ====
Class diagram showing generalization between the superclass Person and the two subclasses Student and Professor

The generalization relationship—also known as the inheritance or "is a" relationship—captures the idea of one class, the so-called subclass, being a specialized form of the other (the superclass, super type, or base class). Where this relationship holds, the superclass is considered a generalization of the subclass. In practice, this means that any instance of the subclass is also an instance of the superclass. An exemplary tree of generalizations of this form is found in biological classification, where, for instance, human is a subclass of simian, which is a subclass of mammal, and so on. The relationship is most easily understood by the phrase “an A is a B” (a human is a mammal, a mammal is an animal).

The UML graphical representation of a generalization is a hollow triangle shape on the superclass end of the line (or tree of lines) that connects it to one or more subtypes.

   symbolic of generalization           (subclass) ———————▻ (superclass)

Dual to generalization is the specialization relationship. Other terms for a (specialized) subclass of a more general superclass include subtype, derived class, derived type, inheriting class, inheriting type, child, and child class.

Note that this relationship, though similar to the biological parent–child relationship, is distinct from it. The use of the terms parent and child is suggestive, but can be misleading.

A is a type of B
For example, "an oak is a type of tree", "an automobile is a type of vehicle"

Generalization can only be shown on class diagrams and on use case diagrams.

==== Realization/Implementation ====
In UML modelling, a realization relationship is a relationship between two model elements, in which one model element (the client) realizes (implements or executes) the behavior that the other model element (the supplier) specifies.

The UML graphical representation of a Realization is a hollow triangle shape on the interface end of the dashed line (or tree of lines) that connects it to one or more implementers. A plain arrow head is used on the interface end of the dashed line that connects it to its users. In component diagrams, the ball-and-socket graphic convention is used (implementors expose a ball or lollipop, whereas users show a socket). Realizations can only be shown on class or component diagrams. A realization is a relationship between classes, interfaces, components and packages that connects a client element with a supplier element. A realization relationship between classes/components and interfaces shows that the class/component realizes the operations offered by the interface.

   symbolic of realization           (implementer) -------▻ (interface)

=== General relationship ===
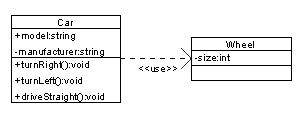
Class diagram showing dependency between "Car" class and "Wheel" class (An even clearer example would be "Car depends on Fuel", because Car already aggregates (and not just uses) Wheel)

==== Dependency ====
Dependency can be a weaker form of bond that indicates that one class depends on another because it uses it at some point in time. One class depends on another if the independent class is a parameter variable or local variable of a method of the dependent class. Sometimes the relationship between two classes is very weak. They are not implemented with member variables at all. Rather they might be implemented as member function arguments.

=== Multiplicity ===
This association relationship indicates that (at least) one of the two related classes make reference to the other. This relationship is usually described as "A has a B" (a mother cat has kittens, kittens have a mother cat).

The UML representation of an association is a line connecting the two associated classes. At each end of the line there is optional notation. For example, we can indicate, using an arrowhead that the pointy end is visible from the arrow tail. We can indicate ownership by the placement of a ball, the role the elements of that end play by supplying a name for the role, and the multiplicity of instances of that entity (the range of number of objects that participate in the association from the perspective of the other end).

**0**	No instances (rare)
**0..1**	No instances, or one instance
**1**	Exactly one instance
**1..1**	Exactly one instance
**0..***	Zero or more instances
*	Zero or more instances
**1..***	One or more instances

== Analysis stereotypes ==
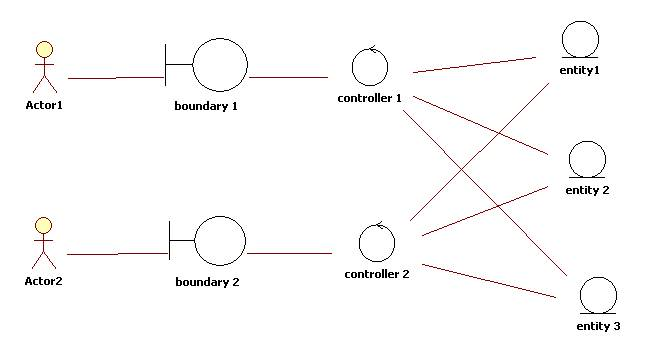

=== Entities ===
Entity classes model long-lived information handled by the system, and sometimes the behavior associated with the information. They should not be identified as database tables or other data-stores.

They are drawn as circles with a short line attached to the bottom of the circle. Alternatively, they can be drawn as normal classes with the «entity» stereotype notation above the class name.

== See also ==
- Executable UML
- List of UML tools
- Object-oriented modeling
- Dependency (UML)

Related diagrams

- Domain model
- Entity–relationship model
- Object diagram
