= Joachim Heinrich Campe =

German writer, linguist and educator

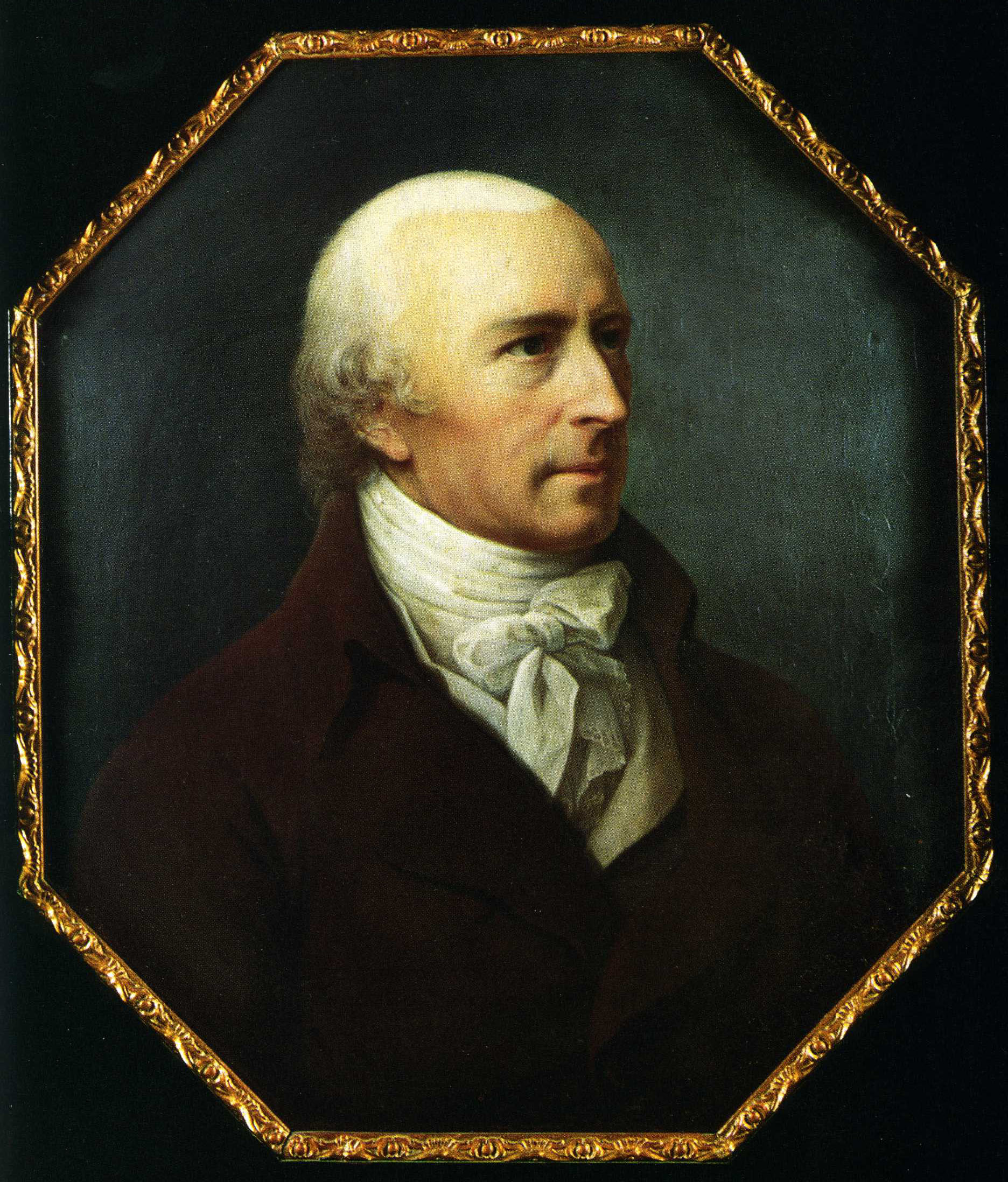
Jochim Heinrich Campe (date and artist unknown)

Joachim Heinrich Campe (29 June 1746 – 22 October 1818) was a German writer, linguist, educator and publisher. He was a major representative of philanthropinism and the German Enlightenment.

== Life ==
Born to the merchant Burchard Hilmar Campe and the preacher's daughter Anna Margaretha Campe (née Gosler) on 29 June 1746, Campe grew up in the village of Deensen in Lower Saxony. After visiting the convent school in nearby Holzminden from 1760 to 1765, he was granted a scholarship and went to study Protestant theology in Helmstedt. His support for his teacher Wilhelm Abraham Teller, whose ideas on an enlightened Christianity were criticised by orthodox theologians, cost Campe his scholarship. He then left Helmstedt and continued his studies of theology in Halle, where he went to lectures of another critical theologian, Johann Salomo Semler.

After his studies, Campe moved to Berlin as a private tutor to the Humboldt family. After being a preacher in Potsdam in 1773 and having been given the task of creating an education programme for the Prussian crown prince, he returned to Tegel and briefly tutored Alexander and Wilhelm von Humboldt, who both stayed in contact with him afterwards. On request of Franz, Duke of Dessau, he joined Johann Bernhard Basedow's Philanthropinum, a teaching institute in Dessau. Because of a disagreement, Campe left before a year was up and went to Hamburg, where he started his own teaching institute based on a family model. Next to tutoring he was active as a writer and published several works for children. His Robinson der Jüngere was published in 1779/80 and the trilogy Die Entdeckung von Amerika followed in 1781/82. Another product of this time was the Allgemeine Revision des gesammten Schul- und Erziehungswesens (1785-1791), a 16-volume work edited by Campe which aimed at being the most complete and sophisticated standard work of educational literature. Among other texts it contains annotated translations of John Locke’s Some Thoughts Concerning Education (1693) and Jean-Jacques Rousseau’s Emile, or On Education (1762). After four years Campe handed his teaching institute over to Ernst Christian Trapp to dedicate more of his time to writing. In 1786 he was called to Braunschweig by Charles William Ferdinand, Duke of Brunswick-Wolfenbüttel, to reform the Braunschweig school system along with Trapp and Johann Stuve. Although his proposals were defeated through conservative opposition, he stayed and in 1787 founded his own publishing house, the Braunschweigische Schulbuchhandlung. Especially because of Campe's own works, the Schulbuchhandlung became economically very successful, and in 1808 he handed it over to his son-in-law, Friedrich Vieweg.

Intrigued by the political movements in France in 1789, Campe and his former pupil Wilhelm von Humboldt travelled to Paris. Campe witnessed the session of the assemblée nationale during which a majority verdict withdrew the privileges from the aristocratic and clerical estates. However, his sympathy for the French Revolution and his being granted honorary French citizenship in 1792 — along with, among others, George Washington and Friedrich Schiller — was not welcomed by many at home.

In his last years, Campe devoted his time to the German language. His language purism is evident in for instance finding German terms for loanwords and the compilation of a German dictionary. For some this linguistic enterprise relates to Campe’s wish to enlighten the people and change society by focusing on words that the common people would understand; other biographers see the focus on the German language as a patriotic endeavour.

He died, aged 72, in Braunschweig on 22 October 1818.

== Children's writer ==
Campe is counted among the founding fathers of the modern genre of intentional or specific children’s and youth literature, along with the writers Christian Felix Weiße and Christian Gotthilf Salzmann. He created a series of works for children and adolescents that were each supposed to be educational, pleasant and directed at a specific age group. His publications ranged from alphabet books to a collection of translated and own travelogues, and to guidance or conduct books for boys and girls.

Probably his best-known work is his Robinson der Jüngere (1779/80), a free adaptation of Daniel Defoe’s Robinson Crusoe (1719) based on Rousseau's suggestions in his Émile. For Reinhard Stach, Robinson was Campe's fate, while for Winfred Kaminski it presents the peak of philanthropinist pedagogy. The book became very popular and was published more than a hundred times in the 19th century. It was translated into English as Robinson the Younger in 1781/82 and into many other European and non European languages. In many languages, it was the first published children's book.

After Robinson, Campe published Die Entdeckung von Amerika (1781/82), which both marked the transition from children's to youth literature, while helping to define youth literature as a genre.

== Language purism ==
Campe developed approx. 11,500 translations for foreign words, of which about 300 survived. They include:

- altertümlich (for antik)
- Erdgeschoss (Parterre)
- Esslust (Appetit)
- Feingefühl (Takt)
- fortschrittlich (progressiv)
- herkömmlich (konventionell)
- Hochschule (Universität)
- Lehrgang (Kursus)
- Randbemerkung (Glosse)
- Streitgespräch (Debatte)
- tatsächlich (faktisch)
- Voraussage (Prophezeiung)
- Wust (Chaos)
- Zerrbild (Karikatur)

Among the translations that did not survive are:

- Zwangsgläubiger (Katholik)
- Freigläubiger (Protestant)
- Heiltümelei (Reliquie)
- Menschenschlachter (Soldat)

== Works ==
- Philosophische Gespräche über die unmittelbare Bekanntmachung der Religion und über einige unzulängliche Beweisarten derselben (1773)
- Allgemeine Revision des gesamten Schul- und Erziehungswesens von einer Gesellschaft praktischer Erzieher (1785-1792)
- Briefe aus Paris (1790)
- Geschichte der französischen Staatsumwälzung (1792)
- Wörterbuch der deutschen Sprache (1807 ff.)

== Works for Children and Young Adults ==
- Kleine Kinderbibliothek (1779-1784)
- Robinson der Jüngere (1779/80)
- Kleine Seelenlehre für Kinder (1780)
- Die Entdeckung von Amerika (1781/82)
- Theophron oder Der erfahrne Rathgeber für die unerfahrne Jugend (1783)
- Erste Sammlung interessanter und durchgängig zweckmäßig abgefasster Reisebeschreibungen für die Jugend (1785-1793, 12 volumes)
- Väterlicher Rath für meine Tochter. Ein Gegenstück zum Theophron, der erwachsenen weiblichen Jugend gewidmet (1789)
- Neue Sammlung merkwürdiger Reisebeschreibungen für die Jugend (1802-1806, 7 volumes)

== English Translations of Some Works ==
- Robinson the Younger (1781/82)
- Elementary Dialogues, for the Improvement of Youth (1792)
- Tales and Colloquial Extracts for the Amusement and Improvement of the Mind (1799)
- The Discovery of America; for the Use of Children and Young Persons (1799-1800)
- Polar Scenes, exhibited in the Voyages of Heemskirk and Barenz to the Northern Regions and in the Adventures of four Russian Sailors at the Island of Spitzbergen (1822)
