= Rudolph Zacharias Becker =

German educator and author (1752–1822)

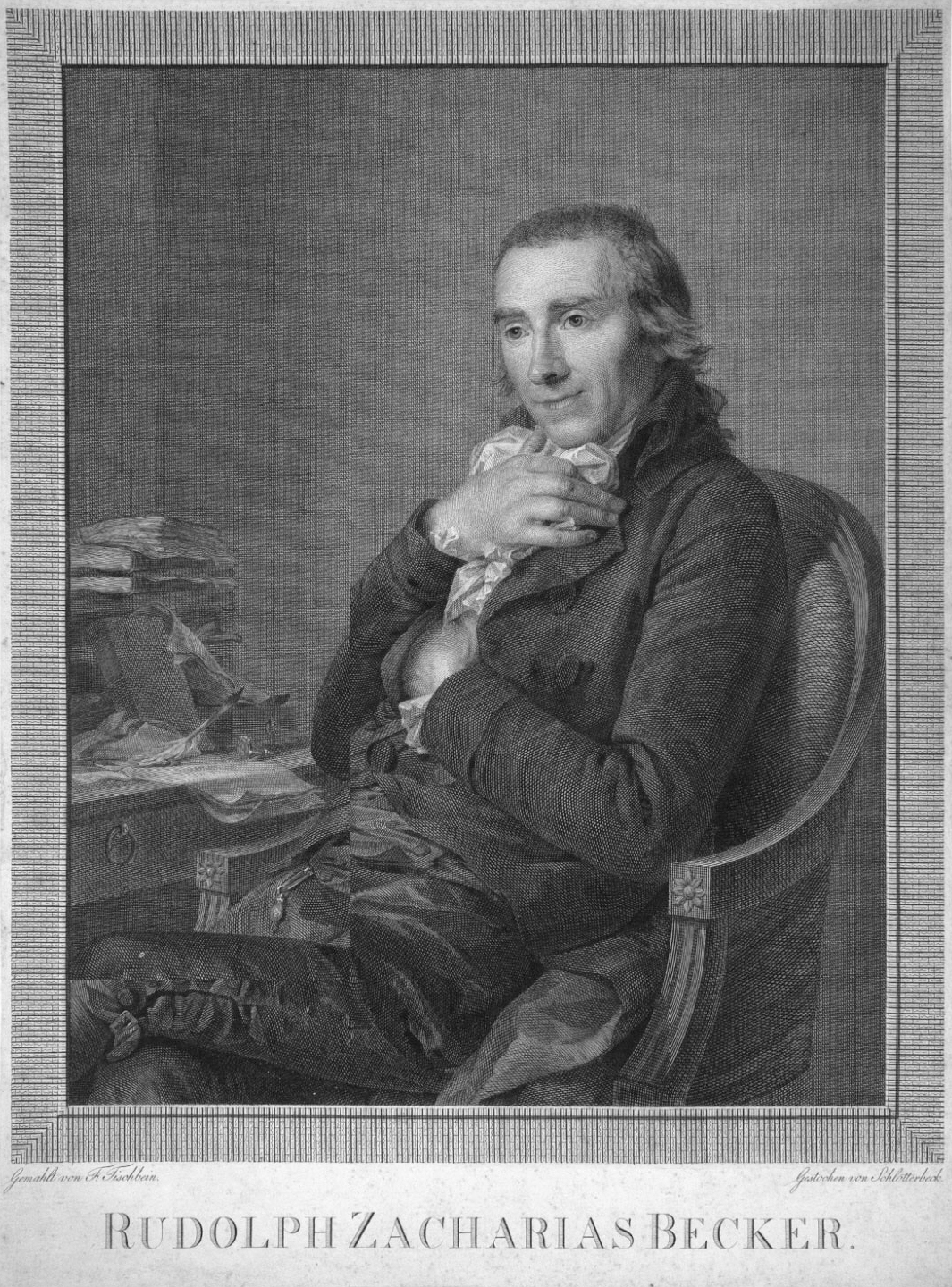
Rudolph Zacharias Becker, after a painting by Johann Friedrich August Tischbein (Christian Jakob Schlotterbeck, 1799)

Rudolph Zacharias Becker (8 April 1752 in Erfurt, Archbishopric of Mainz – 28 March 1822 in Gotha) was a German educator and author.

== Biography ==
He studied theology at the University of Jena. As instructor at the Basedow "Philanthropinum," at Dessau, he founded a journal entitled Dessauische Zeitung für die Jugend und ihre Freunde, which he afterwards continued at Gotha (1784), under the title of Deutsche Zeitung für die Jugend, and which in 1796 was published as the Nationalzeitung der Deutschen. In consequence of an article in the latter publication, he was arrested for conspiring against Napoleon by the French, and imprisoned at Magdeburg for 17 months. He described his experiences during that period in the narrative entitled Beckers Leiden und Freuden in 17monatlicher französischer Gefangenschaft (Becker's Trials and Joys during 17 months of French imprisonment; 1814). He contributed to German art with his edition of Holzschnitte alter deutscher Meister (Woodcuts of old German masters; 1808–16).

One of his publications, bearing the title of Not- und Hilfsbüchlein für Bauerleute, oder lehrreiche Freuden- und Trauergeschichte des Dorfes Mildheim (A Little Book of Needful Help, or Instructive Tales of Joy and Sorrow in the Village of Mildheim; Gotha, 1787–1798), became exceedingly popular. Over 500,000 copies were soon disposed of. He also produced other works and journals, and the extensive transactions in them led him, in 1797, to set up a publishing and bookselling establishment at Gotha, which was continued by his son, Friedrich Gottlieb Becker (1792–1865).
