= Business diagram =

Business diagram may refer to:

- Flowcharts: Basic flowchart, Audit Flowcharts, Cause-Effect (Fishbone) Diagrams, cross-functional vertical and horizontal diagrams, data-flow diagrams, opportunity flowchart, workflow diagram
- Organizational Charts (Org charts)
- Project management: Gantt chart, Project schedules, PERT Charts, Calendar, Timelines
- Comparison charts
- Block diagrams and Bar charts
- Venn diagrams, other marketing diagrams
- Business processes
- IDEF0 diagram
- TQM diagram
