= Fourcroy =

Fourcroy may refer to:

- Antoine François Fourcroy (1755-1809), a French chemist
- Charles-René de Fourcroy (1715-1791), a French military engineer, member of the Academy of Sciences, author of the Tableau poléométrique
- Cape Fourcroy, a cape located at the western tip of Bathurst Island, Northern Territory, Australia
- 13180 Fourcroy, a main-belt asteroid discovered in 1996
