= Charles-René de Fourcroy =

French mathematician

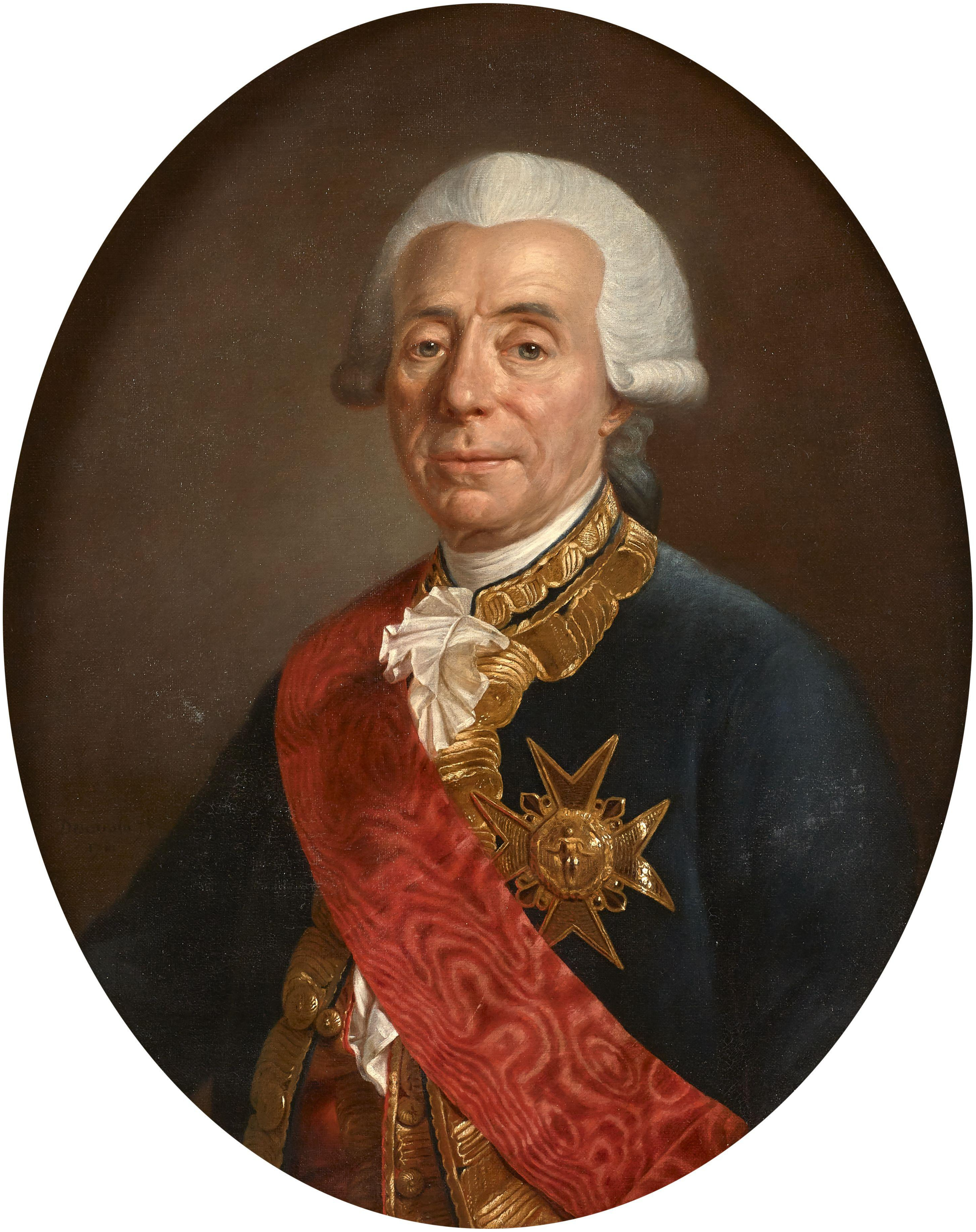
- Charles-René de Fourcroy by Remi-Fursy Descarsin, in 1781

Charles-René de Fourcroy de Ramecourt (1715–1791) was a French officer of the Royal Engineers Corps. He is known for having published the first synthetic map of urban geography in his Essai d'une table poléométrique (1782).

== Biography ==
Grandson of Nicolas de Fourcroy, King's Councillor at the Bailiwick and Royal Provost of the town of Clermont, and son of Charles de Fourcroy, lawyer, Charles-René de Fourcroy was born in Paris on 19 January 1715. He entered the Corps du Génie in 1735 or 1737, became a member in 1740 and then captain in 1744. He became director of fortifications for the Minister of War in December 1774, then maréchal de camp on 1 March 1780.

He married Marie Marguerite Lemaistre (1732-1772) on 6 November 1755 in Andonville and they had two daughters: Charlotte Marie Louise Cornélie (1758-?) and Charlotte Marie Françoise (1762-1765).

He was a member of the Royal Academy of Sciences, appointed correspondent of Abbé Nollet on 25 November 1767, then of Pingré on 20 June 1770. He was created Grand Cross of the Order of Saint-Louis in 1781. A bust portrait was made in 1781 by René Descarsin (now the property of the Conservatoire du portrait du dix-huitième siècle, CPDHS). In 1835, an engraving was made by L. Lorin and lithographed by Langlumé.

== Work ==
Fourcroy was the author of Essai d'une table poléométrique, a treatise on engineering and civil construction, published in 1782, which is remarkable for its period in its use of graphs to list the achievements of civil engineers of bridges and roads from 1740 to 1780 and its cross-sectional and mathematical analysis of the growth of urban areas.

=== Essai d’une table poléométrique, 1782 ===
In 1782 Fourcroy published his Essai d'une table poléométrique, ou amusement d'un amateur de plans sur les grandeurs de quelques villes; Avec une Carte, ou Tableau qui offre la comparaison de ces Villes par une même échelle. This book gives an analysis of the urban growth of European cities, which are graphically compared in a diagram, called Table poléométrique or Poleometric Table.

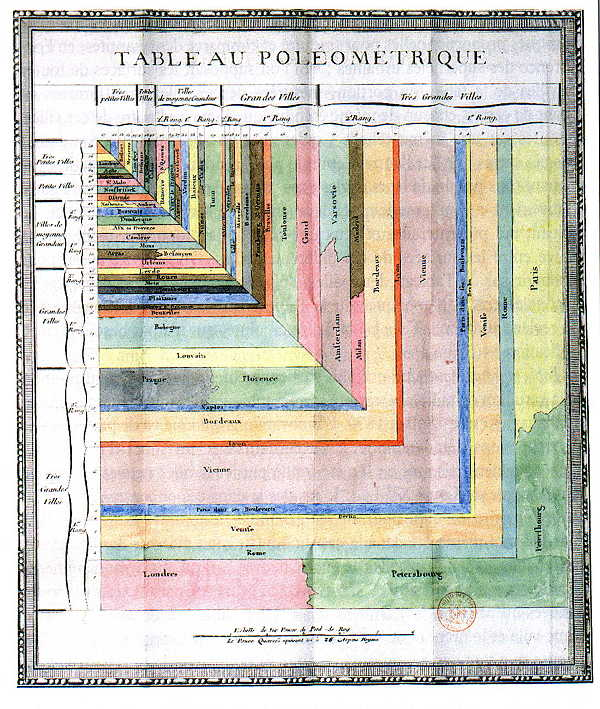
Tableau poléometrique, 1782, by Charles-René de Fourcroy

In his work Fourcroy (1782) explained:

"If we have the surfaces (i.e., areas) of all the cities/villages in the table, or the proportions representing these cities, transformed into cross-sections, each of equal extension, and each on the same scale; then if we successively put one on the other, from the largest to the smallest, and joined all by one of their angles; these squares would overlap relative to their size, and the whole would form a kind of table that visually represents an idea of the actual proportion that can be found between the surfaces of these different cities. We could as well find in this table two cities of equal size, cut their squares diagonally, and have the table represent only half of each; which essentially means the same. Such is the attached figure, which requires no further explanation."

A 1782 review of this work by Élie Catherine Fréron noticed that the Table poléométrique is plausible for 230 cities, foreign and domestic. More recently Jacques Bertin in his Semiology of Graphics (1983) further explained the work, which was first published anonymously. In the French National library the work is still listed by its publisher. Bertin wrote

"The 'Poleometric Table' (see figure), published in 1782 by Dupain-Triel, is one of the oldest proportional representations of human phenomena which is currently known. François de Dainville has demonstrated... that the author was Charles de Fourcroy, a Director of Fortification. [in the diagram] each city is represented by a square whose area is proportional to the geographic area occupied by the city (and for the smallest cities, by a half square only, divided by the diagonal line.
When superimposed, the squares are classed automatically. This results in visual groupings which lead the author to propose an 'urban classification.' This example allows us to appreciate the evolution of graphic representation and the efficiency of more recent solutions, based on the standard construction."

Following Fourcroy's map, a not so far comparison diagram was published in 1785 by the German economist and statistician August Friedrich Wilhelm Crome, was entitled "Groessen Karte von Europa." This map made a comparison of European states, instead of a comparison of cities in the Poleometric Table.

Palsky (1996) concluded, that "the Table established by Fourcroy signals a fundamental moment in the evolution of the graphical method. We see the passage to the abstract, to fictitious features. By these proportional triangles, the author constructs an image that does not return/relate to its original existence."

The attribution of authorship of the manuscript was carried out in 1958 by François de Dainville with the help of internal validations (choice of towns, often places of battle; access to the Galerie des plans en relief du Roi) or external validations (an annotated copy of the work preserved in the Bibliothèque de l'Inspection du Génie bears the handwritten inscription at the bottom of the frontispiece: "made by Mr de Fourcroy, chief of the Génie, and given by him").

== Selected publications ==
- Fourcroy, Charles de. Essai d’une table poléométrique, ou amusement d’un amateur de plans sur la grandeur de quelques villes. Dupain-Triel, Paris (1782)
