= August Friedrich Wilhelm Crome =

German economist and statistician

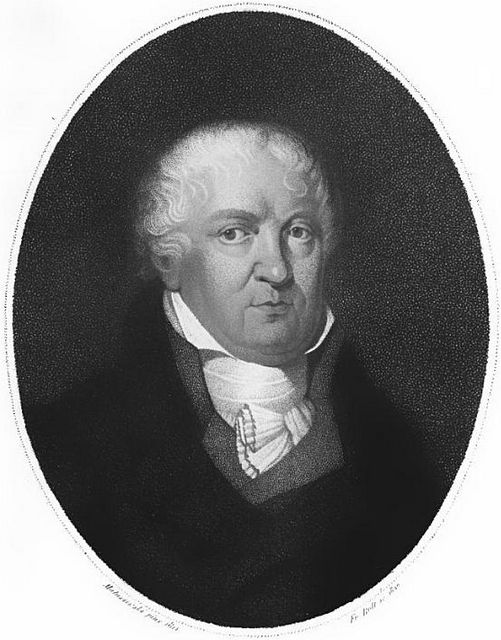
August Crome, 1820

August Friedrich Wilhelm Crome (8 June 1753 in Sengwarden – 11 June 1833 in Rödelheim) was a German economist and statistician, and Professor of Cameralism at the University of Giessen. He is known particularly for his 1782 product map of Europe, which is considered by some as the earliest known printed economic map and thematic map.

== Life and work ==
=== Youth ===
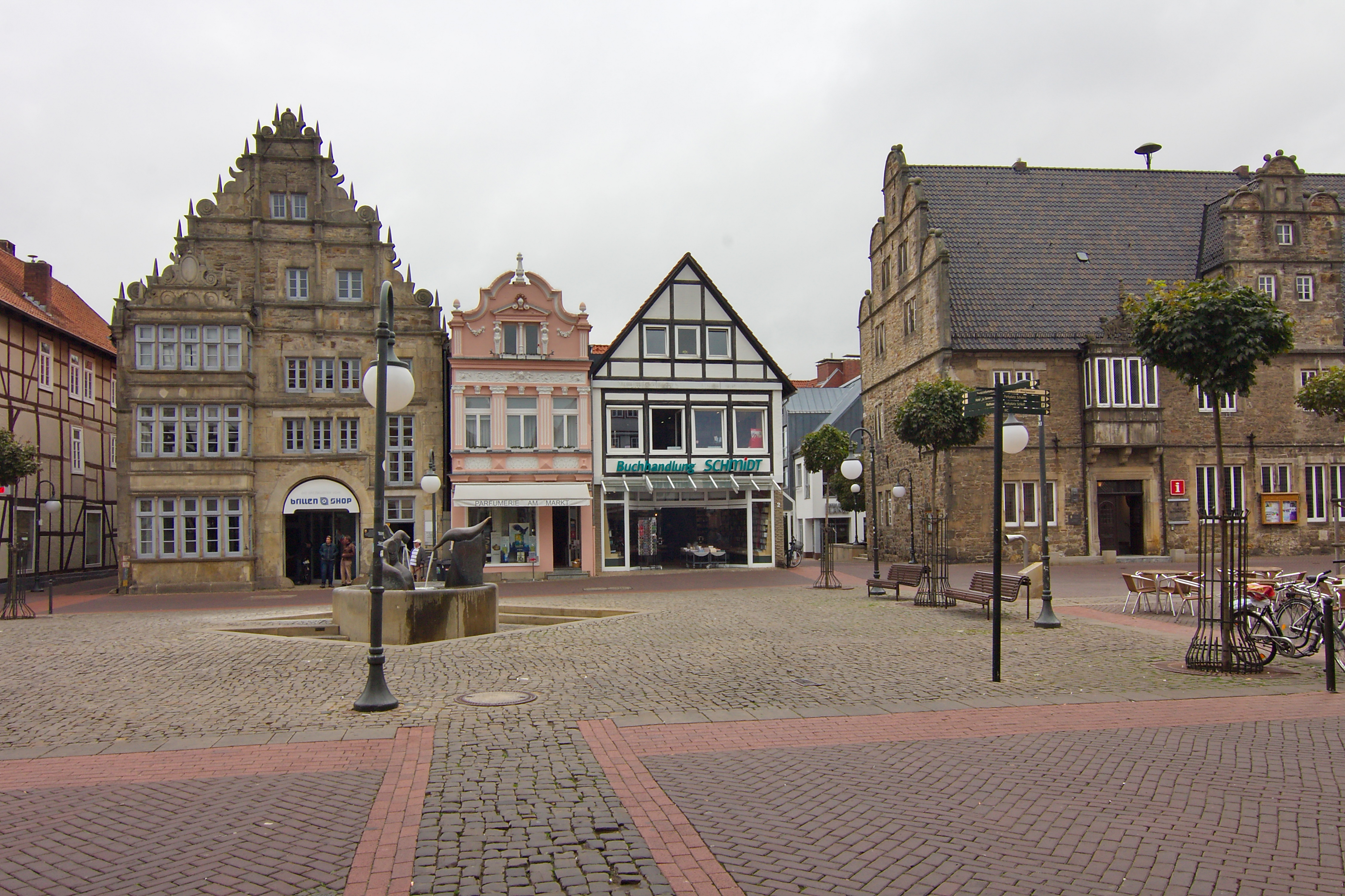
Market place in Stadthagen.

Crome was born into a middle-class family. His father Johann Friedrich Crome (1724-1802) was first headmaster in Stadthagen, then pastor, and later superintendent and official in the village of Sengwarden (allegedly he had two legendary encounters with the devil). His mother Christiane Lucretia, born Büsching, was a pastor's daughter from Stadthagen. In his autobiography (1833) Crome praised the simple life at home, which gave him "a good foundation for a physically strong constitution. Its pure unadulterated sense was connected with true religion of the heart."

Together with his brother Heinrich he was tutored by his father until university entrance. His brother Heinrich later studied law in Göttingen and became a lawyer in Kniphausen.

Thanks to the financial help of his uncle, the geographer, historian, educator and theologian Anton Friedrich Büsching in Berlin, the Count of Bentinck, and the church of his father, Crome was able to study in theology from 1772 to 1774 at the University of Halle. Through teaching at the Latin school of the orphanage, he earned money for lunch and dinner, and gained his first teaching experience.

=== Private tutor in Berlin and Brandenburg ===
After his years at the University of Halle, Crome became private tutor for some time in Berlin and Brandenburg. He continued his theological studies, preached frequently, as he wrote "not without applause", and passed upon a trial sermon for his theological examination. He didn't accept a position offered as a pastor, but remained a private tutor instead, as of May 1775, at the home of Baron von Bismarck in Schönhausen. One of his pupils was the father of the future Chancellor.

Crome's uncle Büsching introduced him to the Berlin Enlightenment circle around Moses Mendelssohn and Christoph Friedrich Nicolai. Crome later reported anecdotally, that one day he had been invited by his uncle in Berlin to present an afternoon trial sermon on the "value of suffering" in the presence of several civil servants. In the foregoing of lunch it however turned into a dispute about the recent published epistolary novel The Sorrows of Young Werther, on which Büsching sharply disapproved, but was defended by Crome. His uncle angry left the lunch table, and Crome was late for church, but then delivered a sermon which reconciled his uncle - so that the Sorrows of Werther would have no lasting fatal effect.

=== Teacher in Dessau ===
Instead of the priest profession, Crome choose a teacher career and taught from 1779 at the Philanthropinum in Dessau, especially in the fields of geography and history. Here he also wrote his first publication, entitled "Über das Verhältnis des Erziehers zu seinen Zöglingen" (On the relationship of the teacher to his pupils). Crome also promoted the ideas for Jewish emancipation of his friend Christian Wilhelm von Dohm.

Another of his respected colleague was Christian Gotthilf Salzmann.

=== Products Map of Europe ===
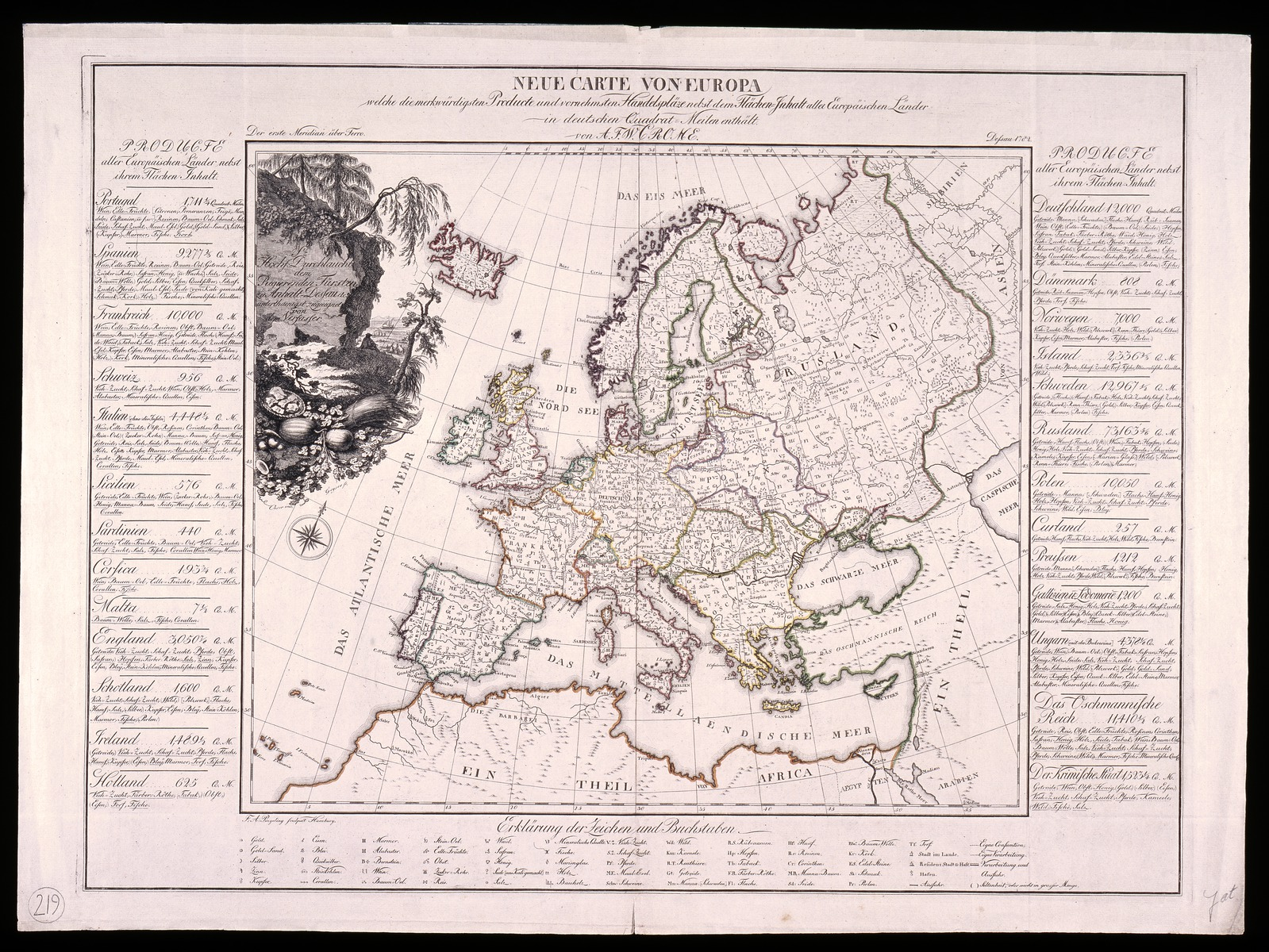
Neue Carte von Europa, 1782: For every country is a listing of products.

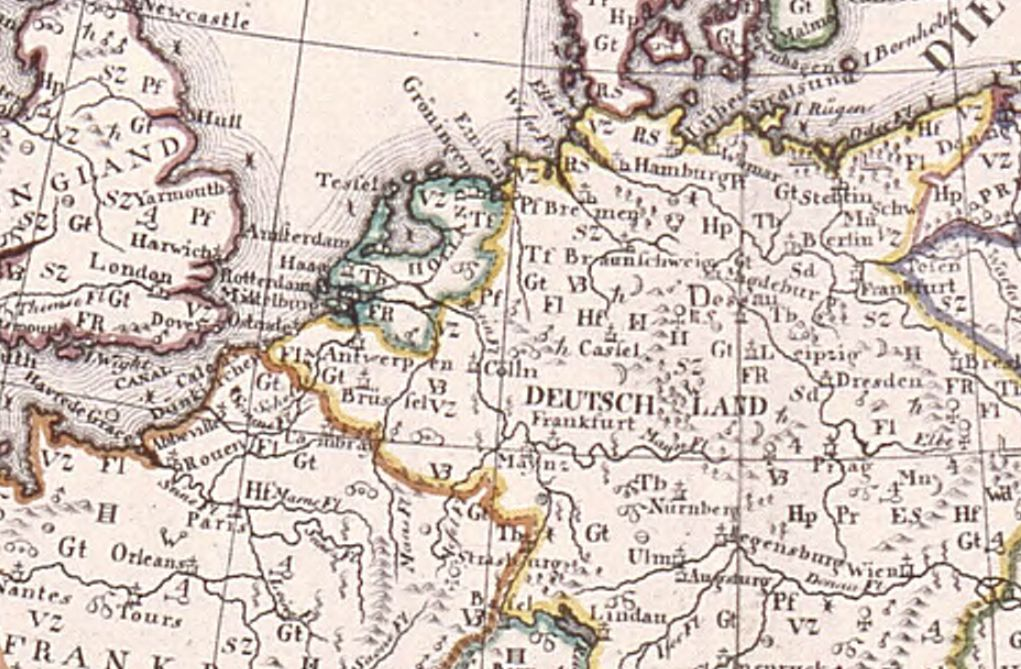
Detail of Crome's 1782 map: Codes on the map locate production areas.

In Dessau Crome developed the work, which would make his fame: the first product map of Europe (1782), entitled "Neue Carte Von Europa welche die merkwürdigsten Producte und vornehmsten Handelspläze nebst dem Flächen-Inhalt aller Europäischer Länder in deutschen Quadrat-Meilen enthält" (New map of Europe which contains the strangest and most prestigious products of trading places together with the surface content of all European countries in German square miles). This map showed for all parts of Europe a recordings of prominent goods and services produced. The map received very positive reception, including a review by Georg Forster, and proved to be a financial success for Crome. Today this map is considered to be the earliest economic thematic map.

Crome started living as private scholar and writer. He published geographic and statistical works and studied the general theory of the state. After statistical analysis of available data, he foresaw the economic rise of the United States and defended their right to independence. In 1783 in Dessau he met the French Enlightenment writer Guillaume Thomas François Raynal.

The honors he received included membership in the Imperial Free Economic Society to St. Petersburg and the Academy of Public Sciences to Erfurt, as well as the philosophical honorary doctorate from the University of Göttingen. The appeal to join the Imperial Academy of Sciences (until 1934 in Saint Petersburg), he refused.

=== Other remarkable maps ===
In the next decennia Crome made a number of other remarkable maps. Starting in 1784, Crome published a road map from the journey from Leipzig to Magdeburg, entitled "Reise-Karte von Leipzig nach Magdeburg".

The next year in 1785 he published historically one of the first statistical maps, and one of the first comparison diagrams. This map, entitled "Groessen-Karte von Europa, welche den Flächen-Inhalt und die Volksmenge der vorzüglichsten europäischen Staaten und Länder enthält," compared the size of the countries and the size of its population of all states and countries in Europe. This map was another example of a new representations in political economy, and would inspire a new generation of cartographers, such as Alexander von Humboldt in Germany, and Charles Dupin in France.

Other remarkable maps by Crome, 1784-1820
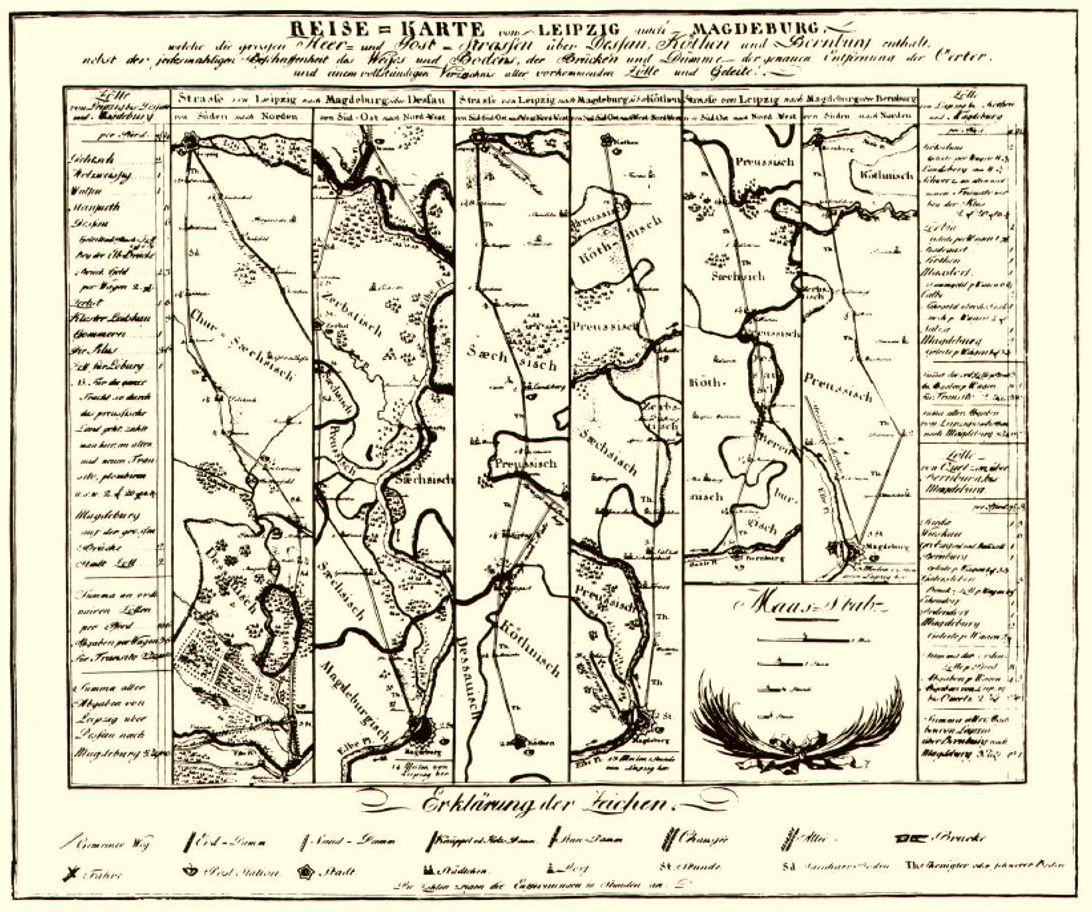
Reise Karte von Leipzig nach Magdeburg, 1784

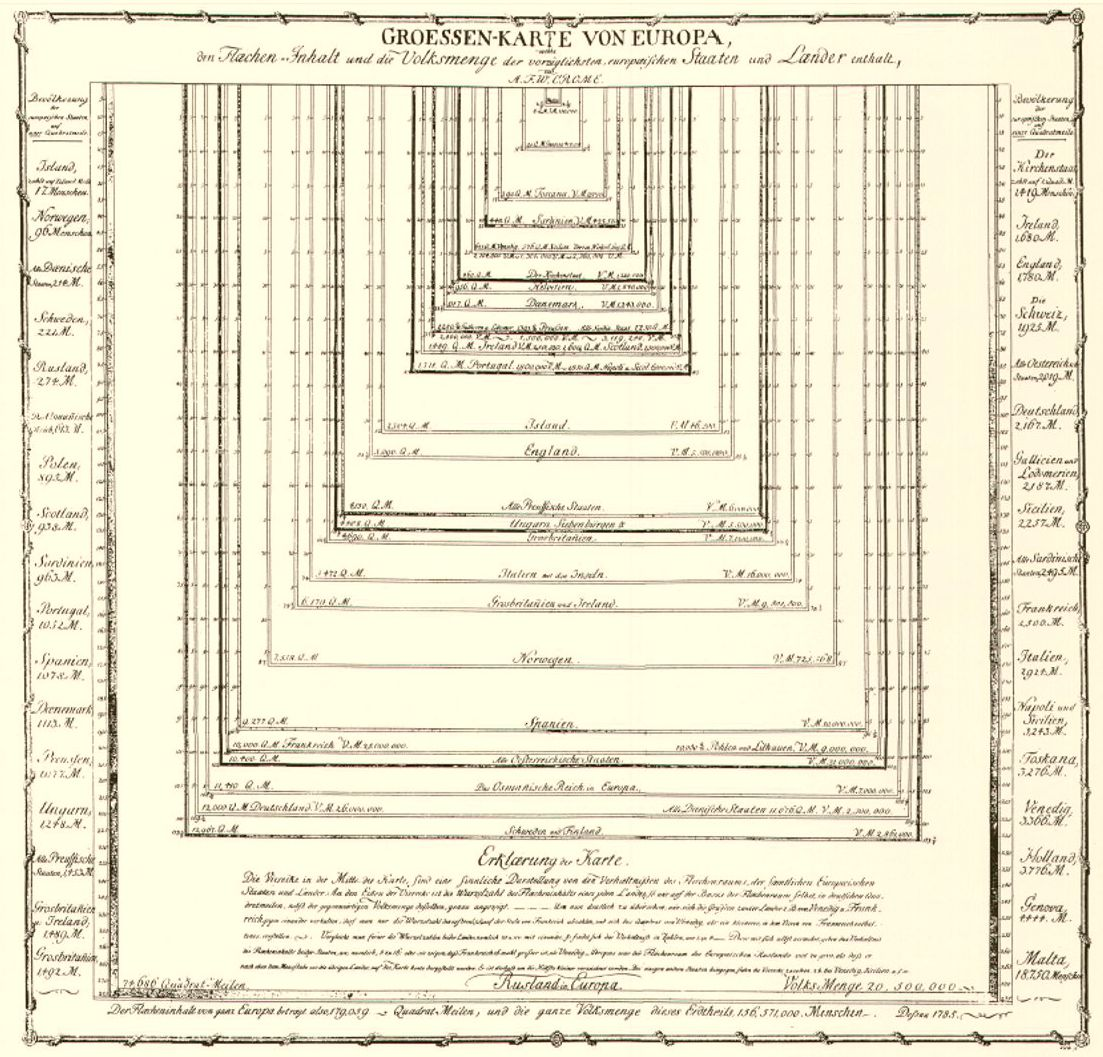
Groessen Karte von Europa, 1785

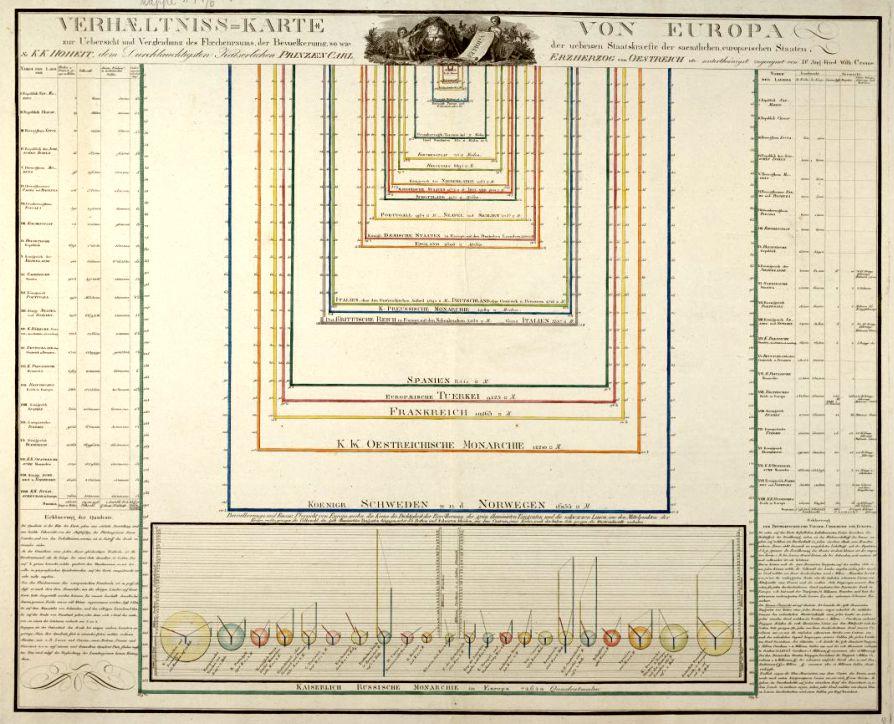
Verhältniss Karte von Europa, 1818

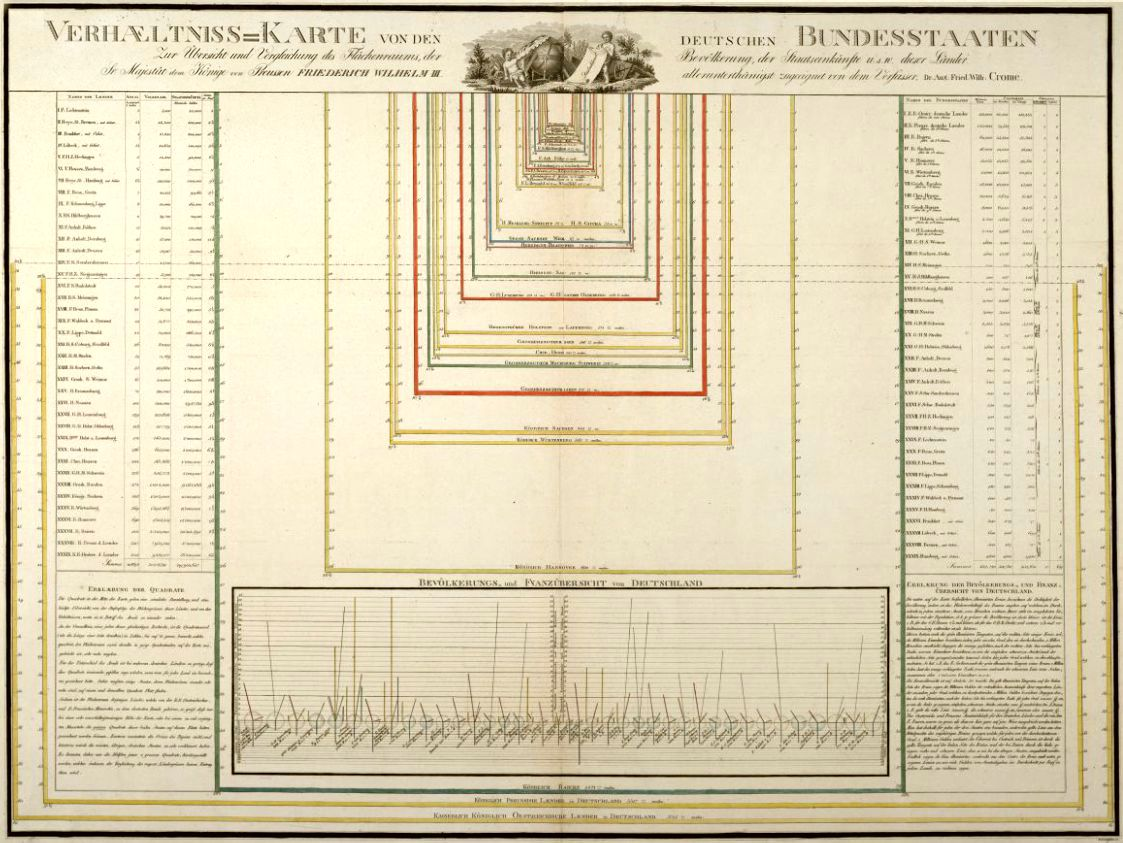
Verhaeltniss Karte von den deutschen Bundesstaaten, 1820

In the years 1818 Comte published a new extended version of his then 25-year-old map "Groessen-Karte von Europa," under the new title "Verhältniss=Karte von Europa." This map was accompanied by the 1818 publication of the book "Allgemeine Uebersicht der Staatskräfte von den sämmtlichen europäischen Reichen und Ländern," in which the subject and the map content was further explained. In compare to the 1785 map, a series of pie charts were added in a separate frame. This was in Europe one of the first applications of the pie chart, which William Playfair had introduced in his "Statistical Breviary" in 1801.

=== Professor in Giessen ===
In 1787 Crome accepted professorship at the University of Giessen, partly offered to him partly because of his rhetorical talent. On the road, he briefly visited Weimar and met Christoph Martin Wieland and Johann Karl August Musäus.

His Latin inaugural treated the relationship between politics and statistics. More than 40 years (until 1830) he practiced the professorship at the same place despite numerous calls from Berlin, Leipzig, Göttingen, Marburg, Greifswald, Basel and others.

His scientific achievements as reformer in the field of mercantilism were less driven by theoretical originality, but rather through practical usefulness, educational preparation and thoroughness. He constantly developed new methods of statistical representation, including one of the first bar charts and area charts.

His political concern was the Enlightenment, the defense of press freedom and public education, in particular by free availability of statistical data.

=== Diplomatic activity ===
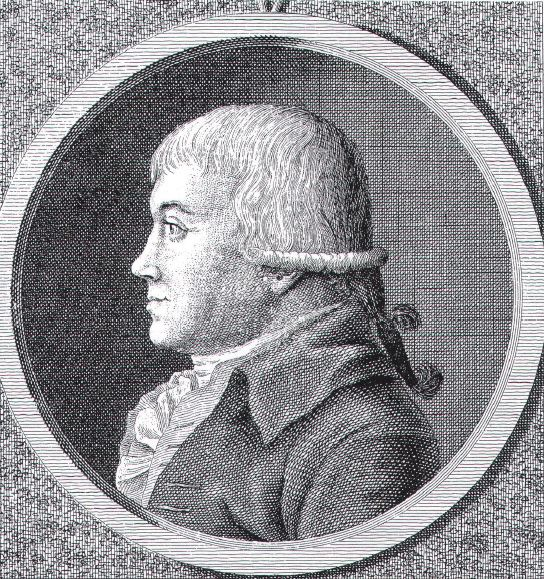
August Crome, 1796

In 1790 Crome had joined, at his request as consulting scholar, the Saxony legislate that traveled to Frankfurt to meet Leopold II. A friend reported him unsolicited for an audience. The Emperor, to that date, Grand Duke of Tuscany, commissioned him after a lively conversation to translate and annotate his work "Governo della Toscana". As a reward, he was promised one of the five prebends of the Protestant founders. His son and successor of Francis II, after another audience, would delivered that promise. Among the 1,000 subscribers of the subsequently published work by Crome were 70 ruling princes.

In 1797 French troops occupied the Upper Hesse and moved their headquarters to Giessen. To General Bernadotte, who took command in Giessen in 1798, Crome build a good relationship and became his frequent dinner guest. As a member of a so-called "War on Land Commission", which had to mediate between the people and the occupiers, Crome, among other things prevented the looting of the University Library in 1799.

After the end of the occupation Crome was commissioned to negotiation of a pacification treaty with Bernadotte in Mainz, whereby a renewed occupation of Hesse-Darmstadt, should be prevented. On the advice of Crome the French changed their plans and chose instead of Darmstadt, at that time only weakly occupied by the Austrians, Mannheim as their headquarters. The secret pacification treaty with the Landlords was completed.

Crome continued negotiations in Mannheim, and became an intimate in the circles of the French generals and politicians. His youngest sister Christiana Dorothea married in 1799 the French staff officer and later Baron de Larroque.

=== Marriage ===
Crome married in 1805, at the age of 52 years, with Demoiselle Dorette Wagner (1778-1857). She was a niece of captain Carl Ludwig Buff (1769-1841) in Wetzlar, a longtime friend Crome. In their house he had seen his future bride for the first time. Carl Ludwig Buff was the older brother of Charlotte Buff, the novelist of Werther, and the father of chemist Heinrich Buff.

Crome's marriage remained childless. His far younger wife survived him by 19 years.

=== Scandal around political writings ===
In his journal Germania Crome had acknowledge to be supporter of the Confederation of the Rhine, whom he praised as a rational creation.

Due to his behavior in the year 1813 he became subject to severe attacks. On request of the French headquarters, he had written the essay, entitled "Deutschlands Crise und Errettung im April und May 1813" (Crises in Germany and salvation in April and May 1813), which was released from draft. He advocated peace with France, warned for a revolutionary war in Germany and the destruction of the German-Franconian culture by a Russian-Asian coalition. He saw France as the protective power for Germany against the East, promised peace to the continent, and foresaw the flourishing of the continental economy and culture with a Napoleonic victory against Great Britain. The German people must preserve peace and order and follow its ruling king.

After the victory of the coalition at Leipzig, Crome subsequently became subject of massive attacks from the Rheinischer Merkur newspaper from Koblenz. Particularly Joseph Görres and Gebhard Leberecht von Blücher called him a "scoundrel". On charges of treason Fatherland, among others by August von Kotzebue, even a death threat followed, and finally the burning on Crome's writings by radical nationalist students at the Wartburg Festival in 1817.

In his 1817 book "Deutschlands und Europas Staats- und Nationalinteresse" (Germany and Europe Heads of State and National Interest), Crome expressed an altered view without commenting his change of opinion. He lashed out at the infamous French secret police, and warned now against a foreign protector power.

Heinrich von Treitschke commented that, the "infamous Bonapartist" only dressed up with the mantle of German patriotism. From the perspective of modern research, it could be considered a pragmatic and rationalistic perspective, that Crome advocates a cautious reform policy of small steps.

In the first session of the State Parliament of Hesse (1821) Crome received much sympathy, particularly for the public presenting his views.

== Selected publications ==
- Von dem Verhältnisse des Erziehers zu seinen Zöglingen und deren Eltern, 1779
- Europens Produkte. Zum Gebrauch der neuen Produkten-Karte von Europa, 1782
- Etwas über die Größe, Volksmenge, Klima und Fruchtbarkeit des Nord-Amerikanischen Frei-Staats, 1783
- Handbuch für Kaufleute, 1784, mehrere Auflagen
- Über die Größe und Bevölkerung der sämtlichen europäischen Staaten, 1785
- Wahlkapitulation Leopold des Zweiten, 1791
- Ueber die Kulturverhältnisse der europäischen Staaten, 1792
- Die Wahlcapitulation des römischen Kaisers, Leopold des Zweiten und Franz des Zweiten, 1794
- Die Staatsverwaltung Von Toskana unter Der Regierung Seiner Königlichen Majestät Leopold II., 1795/1797
- Germanien. Eine Zeitschrift für Staatsrecht, Politik und Statistik von Deutschland, 1808 - 1811
- Deutschlands Crise und Rettung im April und May 1813, 1813
- Deutschlands und Europens Staats- und National-Interesse, 1817
- Allgemeine Uebersicht der Staatskräfte von den sämmtlichen europäischen Reichen und Ländern, 1818
- Geographisch-statistische Darstellung der Staatskräfte von den sämmtlichen, zum deutschen Staatenbunde gehörigen Ländern, 1820
- Handbuch der Statistik des Groherzogthums Hessen, 1822
- Selbstbiographie. Ein Beitrag zu den gelehrten und politischen Memoiren des vorigen und gegenwärtigen Jahrhunderts, 1833

== Maps ==
- Neue Carte Von Europa welche die merkwürdigsten Producte und vornehmsten Handelspläze nebst dem Flächen-Inhalt aller Europäischer Länder in deutschen Quadrat-Meilen enthält, 1782 (Digitalised Universiteit Utrecht Library 1782, with general info here )
- Groessen-Karte von Europa, welche den Flächen-Inhalt und die Volksmenge der vorzüglichsten europäischen Staaten und Länder enthält. Kupferstich von G. A. Liebe. Dessau 1785.
- Verhältniss=Karte von Europa zur Übersicht und Vergleichung des Flächenraums, der Bevölkerung, so wie der übrigen Staatskräfte der sämtlichen, europäischen Staaten, about 1792, 2nd edition 1818. (Digitalised ULB Darmstadt, with general info here)
- Verhaeltniss=Karte von den deutschen Bundesstaaten. Zur Übersicht und Vergleichung des Flächenraums, der Bevölkerung, der Staatseinkünfte u.s.w. dieser Länder ..., c. 1820 (Digitalised ULB Darmstadt, with general info here)
