= John DuVal =

American academic (born 1940)

John Tabb DuVal
- Born: 1940 (age 85–86); Germantown, Philadelphia, U.S.
- Children: Kathleen DuVal

Academic background
- Education: Franklin & Marshall College; University of Pennsylvania; University of Arkansas

Academic work
- Discipline: English and creative writing
- Institutions: University of Arkansas

John Tabb DuVal (born 1940) is an American academic and a translator of Old French, Modern French, Italian, Romanesco, and Italian. He has been a professor of English and Creative Writing and Translation at the University of Arkansas since 1982.

== Biography ==
Born in Germantown, Pennsylvania, in 1940, to Thaddeus Ernest DuVal and Helene Dupont Cau, John DuVal grew up in Jenkintown, a suburb of Philadelphia. He holds an A.B. in English from Franklin and Marshall College in Lancaster, Pennsylvania, a Master of Arts in English from the University of Pennsylvania, and a Master's in French, a Master of Fine Arts in Translation, and a PhD in Comparative Literature from the University of Arkansas. Until 2008 DuVal directed the University's Program in Literary Translation. He is the author of 13 books of translation, and his original poems and articles on translation have been published and republished widely. DuVal's teaching areas of expertise include Translation Theory and Practice; Creative Writing; Comparative Literature; World Sonnet; Dante; Medieval Literature; and Epic Poetry. DuVal was named Fulbright College Visiting Fellow to Wolfson College of Cambridge University (UK) for the year 2010–2011 to complete his translation of the French epic, The Song of Roland.

== Personal life ==
His daughter is the historian Kathleen DuVal, with whom he edited the anthology Interpreting a Continent.

== Selected honors and awards ==
- 2006: Raissiz/de Palchi Award for best book of translations from Italy (Tales of Trilussa), awarded by the Academy of American Poets.
- 1992: Harold Morton Landon Translation Award for The Discovery of America, awarded by the Academy of American Poets.
- 1982: Cuckolds, Clerics, and Countrymen, a Choice magazine Outstanding Academic Book of the Year.

== Selected publications ==
- The Song of Roland, tr. from Old French. Cambridge, MA: Hackett Publishers, 2012.
- Interpreting a Continent: Voices from Colonial America (with Kathleen DuVal), Rowman and Littlefield Publishers, March 2009.
- From Adam to Adam: Seven Old French Plays (with Raymond Eichmann), Asheville, NC: Pegasus Paperbooks, 2005.
- Oblivion and Stone: A Selection of Contemporary Bolivian Poetry and Fiction (ed. Sandra Reyes, co-translated with Reyes, Gastón Fernández-Torriente, and Kay Pritchett). Fayetteville: University of Arkansas Press, 1998.
- Fabliaux, Fair and Foul (with Raymond Eichmann), Binghamton, NY.: Pegasus Paperbooks of The Medieval and Early Renaissance Texts Society, 1992; reprinted by Pegasus, Asheville, N.C., 1999 and 2008.
- The Discovery of America by Cesare Pascarella, tr. from Romanesco. Fayetteville: University of Arkansas Press, 1991; reprinted, 2006.
- Tales of Trilussa by Carlo Alberto Salustri, tr. from Romanesco. Fayetteville: University of Arkansas Press, 1990; reprinted, 2006.
- Long Blues in A Minor by Gerard Herzhaft, tr. from French. Fayetteville: University of Arkansas Press, 1988; reprinted, 2006.
- The Fabliaux: The B.N. 837 Manuscript (with R. Eichmann). New York: Garland Library of Medieval Literature, Vol. II, 1986.
- The Fabliaux: The B.N. 837 Manuscript (with R. Eichmann). New York: Garland Library of Medieval Literature, Vol. I, 1984.
- Cuckolds, Clerics, and Countrymen: Medieval French Fabliaux (with Raymond Eichmann). Fayetteville: University of Arkansas Press, 1982.
