= Numa Broc =

French geographer (1934-2017)

- Born: Numa Camille Broc; 26 January 1934; Versailles, Yvelines, France
- Died: 12 March 2017 (aged 83); Perpignan, France
- Education: University of Clermont-Ferrand
- Occupation: geographer

Numa Broc, born on 26 January 1934, in Versailles and died in Perpignan on 12 March 2017, was a French geographer, specialising in the history and epistemology of geography.

== Biography ==
From a family of civil servants, Numa Broc attended secondary school at the Lycée de Perpignan (1945–1951) before studying at the University of Clermont-Ferrand (1951–1955). After obtaining the CAPES in 1956, he became an agrégé in geography in 1960.

He taught at the Lycée de Beauvais in 1956–1957, then in Algeria from 1957 to 1959, in Constantine and Algiers. With a doctorate in literature, he met François de Dainville in 1964, who directed him towards the history of geography and explorers. He thus defended his third cycle thesis in Montpellier in 1966 on the mountains in the Age of Enlightenment, then his doctoral thesis in 1971 titled La Géographie des philosophes.

He married Marie-Louise Rouzaud, who supported him throughout his life in his research.

As an assistant and then associate professor at the University of Montpellier, Broc was appointed professor of geography at the University of Perpignan in the early 1980s. A member of the ERA team (Epistemology of the History of Geography) at the French National Centre for Scientific Research, he authored numerous articles in geographical and academic journals as well as several books. He ended his career as emeritus Professor at the University of Perpignan.

Despite his visual impairment, which affected him in the latter part of his professional career, with the help of his wife Marie Louise and a friend, he wrote and published his last work in 2 volumes: Une histoire de la géographie physique en France (XIXe – XXe siècles) in 2010 at the age of 76.

Broc was also president of the Perpignan Alpine Club.

He died in Perpignan on 12 March 2017. He bequeathed a portion of his prestigious library and documents to the University of Perpignan and the municipality of Perpignan. He was buried in the Vieux Cimetière of Thuir.

== Works ==
- Les montagnes vues par les géographes et les naturalistes de langue française au XVIIIe siècle, Bibliothèque nationale, 1969.
- La géographie des philosophes, géographes et voyageurs français au XVIIIe siècle, Presses Universitaires de Strasbourg, 1975.
- La géographie de la renaissance / 1420-1620, CTHS, Paris, 1986.
- L'Hydraulique agricole en Roussillon, in Bulletin de la Société Languedocienne de Géographie, tome 4, Fascicules 2 et 3, 1980.
- Les grandes missions scientifiques françaises au XIXe siècle (Morée, Algérie, Mexique) et leurs travaux géographiques, 1981.
- Quelle est la plus ancienne carte moderne de France ?, Armand Colin, 1983.
- La cartographie reflet de l'histoire by François de Dainville (scientific director), Slatkine, 1986.
- Autour du monde 1767-1771, Voyage de François de Pagès par terre et par mer, Imprimerie nationale, 1991.
- Athanase et le Mont Ophir (foreword), Edisud, 1992.
- De l'eau et des hommes en terre catalane, with Michel Brunet, Sylvie Caucanas, Bertrand Desailly, and Jean-Pierre Vigneau, Trabucaire, 1993.
- Une histoire de la géographie physique en France (XIXe – XXe siècles), Presses Universitaires de Perpignan, 1993.
- Regards sur la géographie française de la renaissance à nos jours, Presses Universitaires de Perpignan, 1994.
- Montagnes au siècle des lumières, perception et représentation, CTHS, 1995.
- Dictionnaire illustré des explorateurs et grands voyageurs français du XIXe siècle, vol. 1, Afrique, Cths, 1988.
- Dictionnaire illustré des explorateurs et grands voyageurs français du XIXe siècle, vol. 2, Asie, Cths, 1999.
- Dictionnaire illustré des explorateurs et grands voyageurs français du XIXe siècle, vol. 3, Amérique, Cths, 1999.
- Dictionnaire illustré des explorateurs et grands voyageurs français du XIXe siècle, vol. 4, Océanie, Cths, 2003.

== Bibliography ==
- Robert Cornevin, Numa Broc et les explorations africaines, in Dictionnaire illustré des explorateurs et grands voyageurs français du XIXe siècle, vol. 1, Afrique, CTHS, 1988, pp. 11–14.
- Aline Rousselle, Le Paysage rural et ses acteurs, 1998, p. 11
- Robert P. Beckinsale, Richard J. Chorley, The History of the Study of Landforms, vol. 3, 2003, p. 477
