= The Discovery of America =

German book trilogy

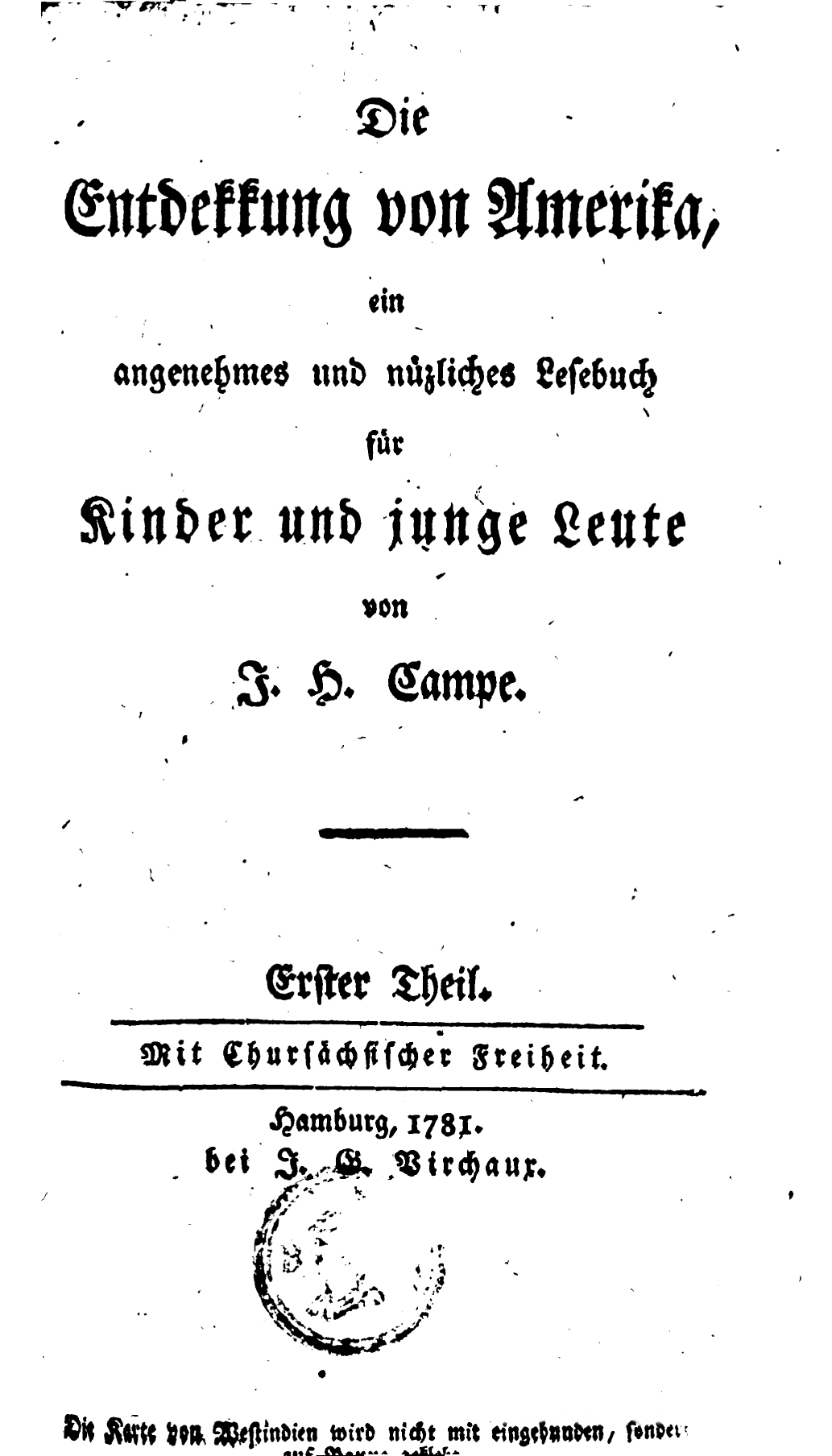
Title page of 1781 German edition of The Discovery of America, Volume I

The Discovery of America is a trilogy written by the German author and educator Joachim Heinrich Campe (1746–1818). It was originally published in 1781/82 as Die Entdekkung von Amerika – ein angenehmes und nützliches Lesebuch für Kinder und junge Leute and deals with the discovery, early exploration and conquest of America by focusing on one explorer in each volume: Christopher Columbus is treated first, followed by Hernán Cortés and finally Francisco Pizarro. The work is counted among the first books of specific children's literature, directly targeting children and adolescents as its main audience, and Campe is said to have "set the standard for German children's literature." The trilogy is defined by its author's involvement in the German educational movement of philanthropinism and has been a great success, also being translated into several languages.

== Content ==
Volume I follows the explorer Cristobal Colon, (Christopher Columbus in English) (Kristoff Kolumbus in the German edition) from his hometown Genoa and his first voyages to his encounter with Ferdinand and Isabella of Spain. After a description of the voyage towards the West and the discovery of the New World, the narrative relates Columbus’ first encounter with Native Americans as well as the first military conflicts.

In the second volume the reader is introduced to the conquistador Hernán Cortés (Ferdinand Kortes) and his exploration and conquest of the Aztec Empire. The explorations of the Central American mainland are followed by encounters with Native tribes, some of which become Cortés’ allies in his later conquest of the Aztec Empire. After the death of the Aztec emperor Montezuma and the takeover of the empire's capital Tenochtitlan, the narrative gives a summary of the following subjugation of the rest of Mexico and of Cortés’ troubles with people envious of him.

Finally, the last volume deals with Francisco Pizarro (Franz Pizarro) and the conquest of the Inca Empire and Chile. It describes the journey along the west coast of South America and the society of the Incas. Next to the founding of Lima, the murder of the Inca Atahualpa, and the siege and takeover of Cuzco the narrative also relates the quarrels between Pizarro and some of the other Spanish generals. The volume ends with Pizarro's death.

== Narrative structure ==
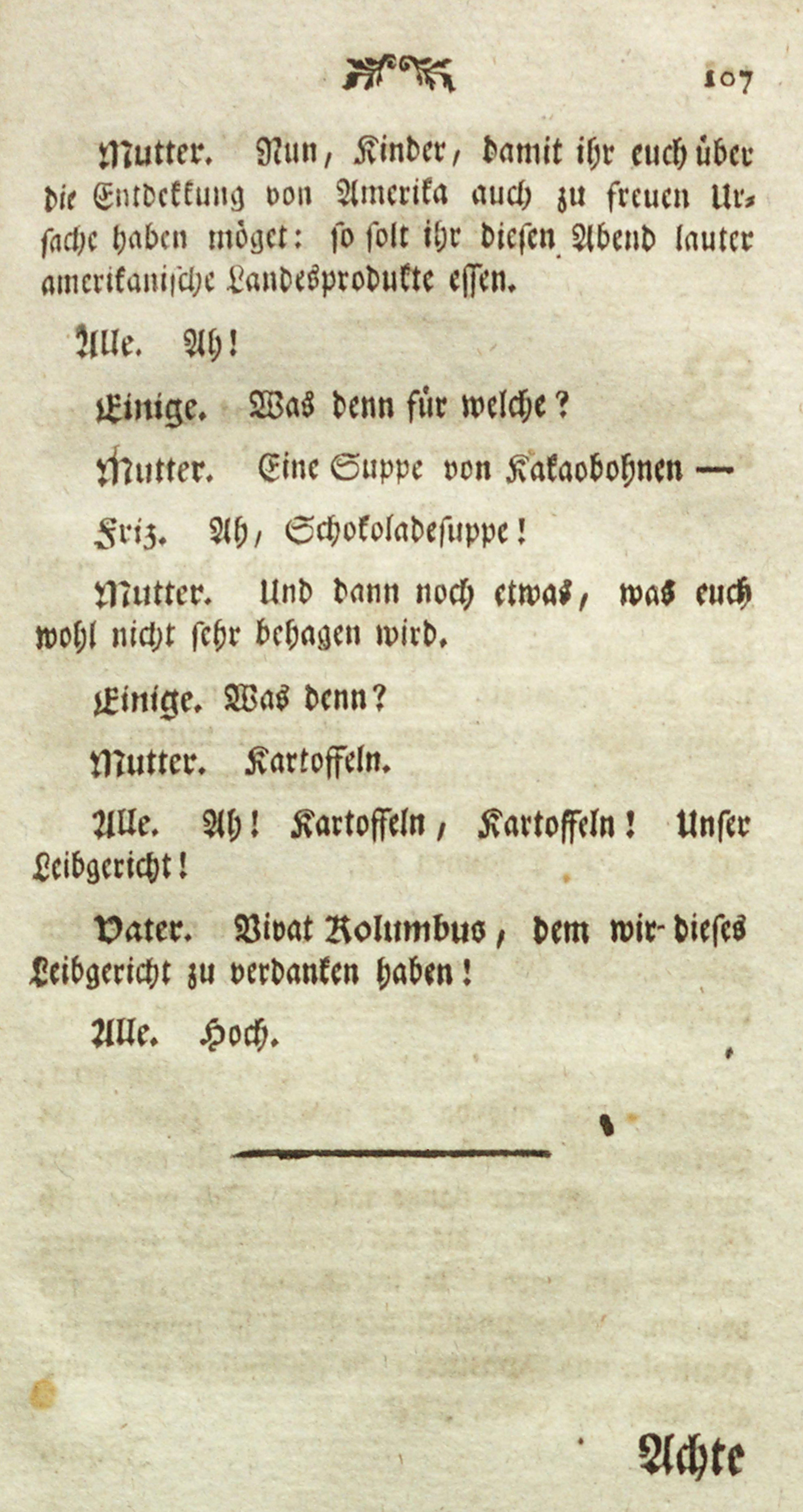
Page 107 of a 1782–88 (unauthorised) German edition of the book, showing the typical dialogue form.

The trilogy is divided into fifty-two narratives that run continuously from the first to the last volume. Each narrative is supposed to reflect the narrations in which Campe originally told the story to his foster children. The dialogue form, which is characterised by interruptions from the children but also comments by the narrating Father, is sometimes described as "Socratic," aiming at extracting the children's knowledge through skilfully asked questions.

== Genre ==
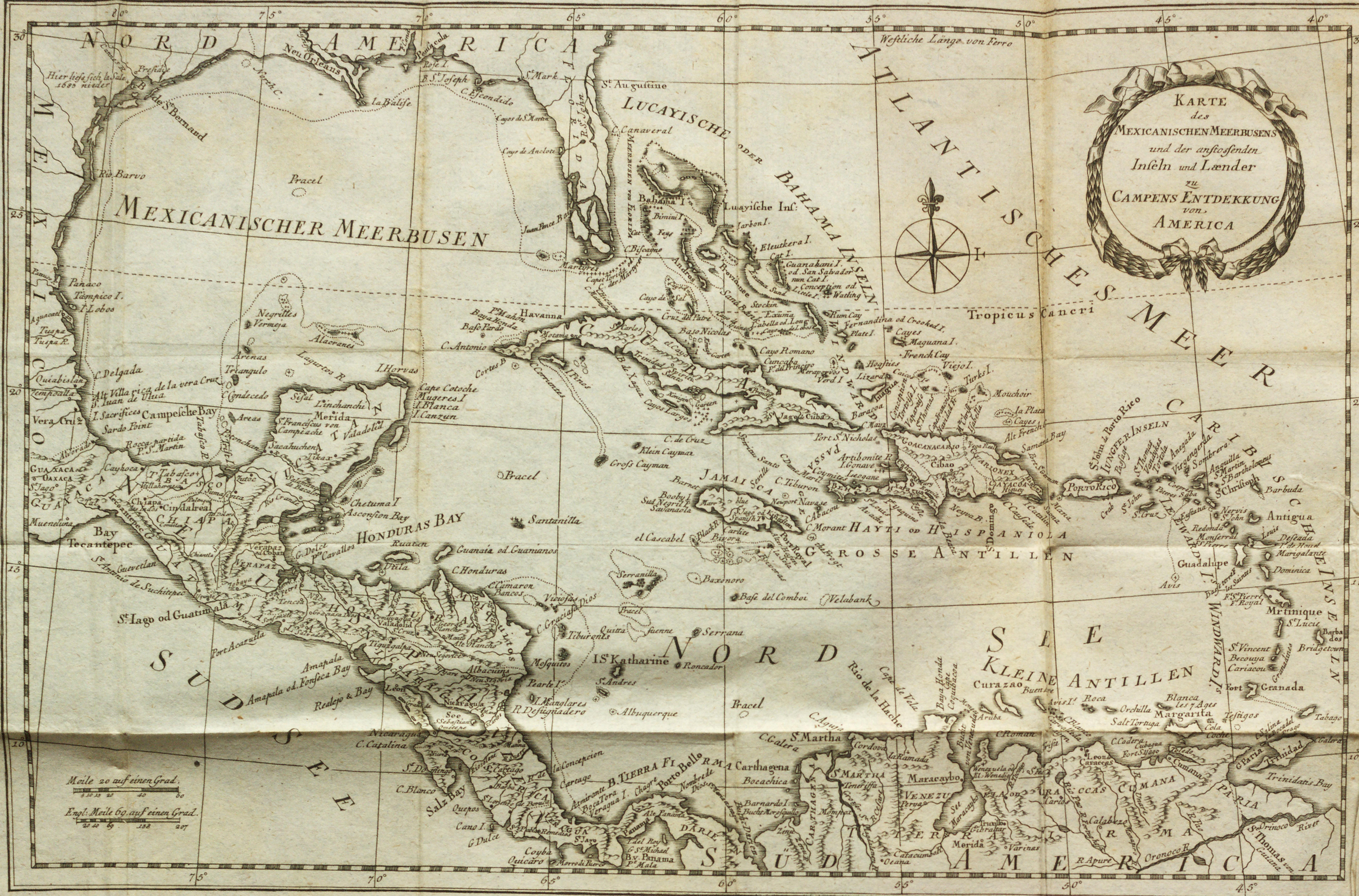
Map of the Gulf of Mexico, included in the 2nd volume of a 1782–88 (unauthorised) German edition of The Discovery of America

Discovery is an example of early specific children's and youth literature which developed with the German educational movement of philanthropinism. The focus of philanthropinist children's writers lay in creating age-appropriate books which would serve their pedagogical purposes of teaching moral and factual knowledge. The philanthropinist background of the trilogy is apparent in its transmission of morals and of facts, especially related to the natural sciences. The first volume, for instance, contains an explanation of the system of longitude and latitude, and each volume is accompanied by a map of the dealt-with area of Central or South America. The narrative occasionally refers to these maps.

== Publication history and editions ==
The trilogy is part of a larger work of Campe. It follows his earlier books Kleine Kinderbibliothek (1779–84) and Robinson der Jüngere (1779/80), translated into English as Robinson the Younger, the New Robinson or Robinson Junior, which is Campe's free adaptation of Daniel Defoe's Robinson Crusoe (1719). At the same time Discovery presents a preparation for the subsequently published first collection of travelogues, Erste Sammlung interessanter und durchgängig zweckmäßig abgefasster Reisebeschreibungen für die Jugend (1785–93, 12 volumes).

The first German edition was published in 1781 (Kolumbus) and 1782 (Kortes, Pizarro) in Hamburg; in 1790 it saw the third edition and in 1834 the fifteenth authorised edition. The first French translation was published as early as 1782, followed by translations into English, Dutch, Spanish, Swedish, Hebrew and Yiddish. At the same time there were several unauthorised reprints available in German; Campe complained about these in a letter to Emperor Joseph II in 1784.

== Reception ==
Contemporaries of Discovery usually received the work very positively. Louis, Prince of Prussia, expressed his admiration for the first volume of Discovery in a letter to Campe. He excuses his late reply to a previous letter by saying that he first had to reread the book several times and that he wished he possessed all those virtues of Columbus. An anonymous reviewer in the German Enlightenment journal Allgemeine Deutsche Bibliothek praises Campe's choice of topic and its utility but wishes for a more structured approach instead of the narratives. Of the general criticism that the German new humanists and others presented against philanthropinist children's literature, Campe was usually exempt. Towards the end of the nineteenth century, however, the dialogue form had lost its appeal and in 1890 a revised German edition was published that eliminated the dialogue and solely related the narrative.

== Interpretations ==
Works dealing with The Discovery of America mainly point to its pedagogical functions but also see socially critical elements in the text.

=== Morals: hero/antihero ===
Scholars see an antithetical development in the characters of the three discoverers. Richard Apgar describes Columbus as "an enlightener before the Enlightenment," Cortés as strong-willed but repeatedly failing to "act humanely," and Pizarro as "never able to overcome his untended youth." In general, the three men function as moral examples for the reader: Columbus is the hero to look up to, while Cortés and Pizarro present antiheroes and negative role-models. Rüdiger Steinlein adds that with Discovery, Campe follows the tenet of "Historia magistra vitae:" history is exploited as a teacher in morals and virtues.

=== Anti-colonialism ===
Referring to Sankar Muthu's Enlightenment against Empire (2003), Richard Apgar sees anti-colonialist tendencies in the narrative. According to him, "Campe's text is somewhere on the continuum between legitimizing colonial oppression and standing against colonialism." By connecting "education with exploration and exploration with enlightenment," Campe creates the image of a "good" explorer who was educated in the spirit of the Enlightenment and thus "discovers" in the sense of "enlightening."

=== Revolution and ideal state ===
Eva Funke analyses the description of the Inca state as a utopian bourgeois society in the third volume as a critique of Campe's contemporary society. Thus the description of the ruling system, for instance, functions as a mirror to the current systems of the German states and shows a utopian ideal where the bourgeois characteristic of competence is more important than birth. In addition, Funke points to the recurring motif of revolution in Discovery. The trilogy is presenting revolutions as something that needs to be avoided because they can hinder achieving one's goals and are responsible for the downfall of peoples.
