= Philanthropinism =

Philanthropinism (also philanthropism) is an educational reform movement that was established in the second half of the eighteenth century, rooted in the principles of philanthropy. The name, similar to its rooted origin, is derived from the Greek words for friend and human (φίλος and άνθρωπος respectively). The movement was initiated during the Age of Enlightenment, and accordingly centers around similar social ideas – namely rationalism and empiricism. The movement was, contemporaneously, endorsed by the German philosopher Immanuel Kant. The complementary institute – named Philanthropinum and established by the founder of the movement – has been quoted by Kant as following "the perfect plan of education".

The philanthropinists’ ideas of teaching children to become philanthropic, natural and rational beings are partly derived from the theories of childhood and education proposed by John Locke (1632–1704) and Jean-Jacques Rousseau (1712–1778), among others.

== History ==
Philanthropinism was founded by the German educator Johann Bernhard Basedow (1723–1790). In 1774, Basedow published his Elementarwerk ("Elementary Book"), where his principles regarding the movement were to be explained at length. It was the first in a row of efforts by philanthropinist educators "to theorize and implement an educational plan that integrated social goals" which were directed at improving the well-being of people and of society as a whole. Basedow’s theorisation as well as earlier treatises on education stemmed from a desire of Enlightenment thinkers to transmit their political, social and moral ideals – which could be traditional but also innovative – to the next generation. Basedow’s ideas were partly based on John Locke and Jean-Jacques Rousseau’s theories of education and childhood, of which he picked those elements which seemed most attractive, and his ideas on national education were influenced by La Chalotais. Despite differences, Basedow agreed with both Locke and Rousseau on the need of a child-appropriate education that would take into account a child’s mental capacities.

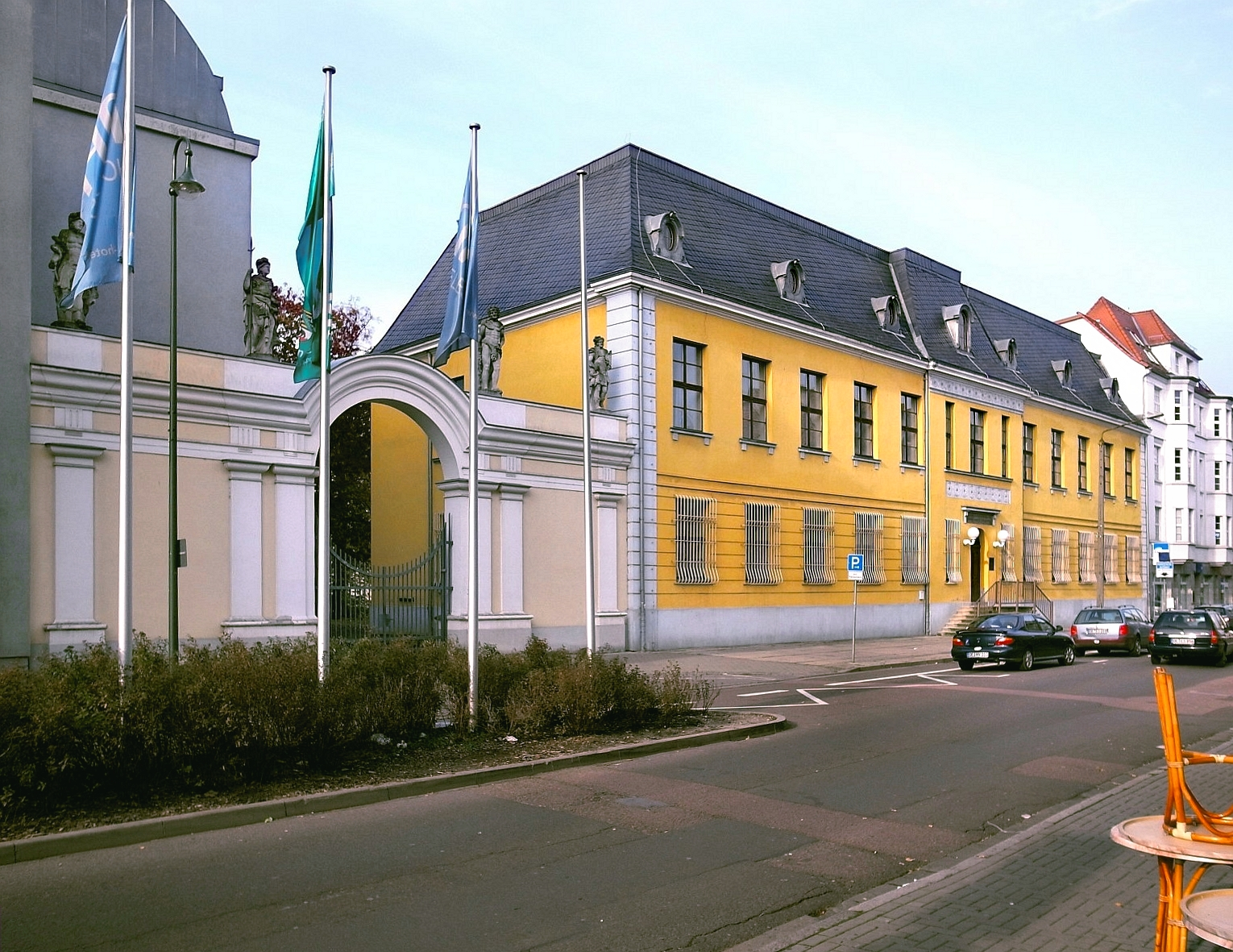
Palais Dietrich, in Dessau, site of the original Philanthropinum

In order to implement his philanthropinist ideas, Basedow wrote a booklet called "Das Noethigste aus der Vorstellung an Menschenfreunde" (Introduction of what is Important to Friends of Humanity (Philanthropists)) wherein he lays out his plans for a new series of illustrated books (later to become his Elementarwerk) and the founding of a school to utilize his education methods. Basedow distributed this booklet to his many wealthy friends and contacts to solicit funding for his new ideas. He gathered substantial financial help from many contributors (Philanthropists) most notably the Empress of Russia, the King of Denmark, the Prince of Dessau and the Prince of Basel. In 1774, The Prince of Dessau was so impressed by Basedow's ideas that he provided a section of his Dessau Palace to hold the school. Basedow called the "Philanthropinum, a school for Philanthropists, Learners and Teachers". Basedow directed the school and taught there as well. The basic principles of his education system are: 1) Everything taught must be taught according to the laws of Nature. 2) The formation of character is more valuable than the acquisition of knowledge. 3) One gains knowledge best through sense perceptions. 4) The teacher must ensure that the student is happy while learning, otherwise the student's ability to learn will be reduced.

Robert Sumser summarises Basedow’s emphasis as being on a "cosmopolitan, nonconfessional, and pragmatic system of education [which] proved inspirational to a younger generation of pedagogues." One of Basedow's fundamental concepts was that education occurs when the students are taught as much as possible in real life and application of the knowledge was highly important. Classes were often held outside or with the use of pictures to make the subject as real as possible. The subjects taught at the Philanthropinum were Mathematics, Languages: French, German and Latin, Eloquence, All religions, Craftwork, Sciences, Sports: Fencing and Gymnastics. Among those pedagogues were German educators such as Joachim Heinrich Campe (1746–1818), Ernst Christian Trapp (1745–1818), Christian Gotthilf Salzmann (1744–1811) but later also the Austrian Vincenz Eduard Milde (1777–1853). Their educational ideas are based on a notion that a human being is not born fully formed but is essentially formable, a notion inspired by Locke’s concept of the tabula rasa. In particular the philanthropinists' goals included education to bliss, to a way of thinking as proposed by Immanuel Kant, to human dignity and morality. Another aspect dealt with the balance between individual perfection and an individual’s utility for civil society, which both needed to be attained without one hindering the other.

Philanthropinism was a comparatively short-lived movement (late eighteenth to early nineteenth century) but influential in the later development of pedagogy, for instance by introducing nonconfessional religious education or physical education. Moreover, philanthropinist writers helped develop the modern genre of children’s literature with their writings for children and "freed [the German children’s literature] from dependence on the great French and English models."

== Well-known philanthropinists ==
- Johann Bernhard Basedow (1724–1790)
- Joachim Heinrich Campe (1746–1818)
- Christian Gotthilf Salzmann (1744–1811)
- Ernst Christian Trapp (1745–1818)
- Friedrich Eberhard von Rochow (1734–1805)
- Christian Heinrich Wolke (1746–1806)
- Peter Villaume (1746–1825)
- Martin Ehlers (1732–1800)
- Friedrich Gabriel Resewitz (1729–1806)
- Karl Friedrich Bahrdt (1741–1792)
- Friedrich Gedike (1754–1803)
- Philipp Julius Lieberkühn (1754–1788)
- Johann Georg Büsch (1728–1800)
- Gottlieb Konrad Pfeffel (1736–1809)
- Caroline Rudolphi (1754–1811)
- Christoph Daniel Ebeling (1741–1817)
- Gottfried Nathanael Fischer (1748–1800)
- Gottfried Benedict Funk (1734–1814)
- Karl Philipp Moritz (1756–1793)
- Hermann Baerwald (1828–1907)
- Franz Joseph Molitor (1779–1860)
- Moses Mendelssohn (1729–1786)
