= Sengwarden =

Village in Lower Saxony, Germany

Coordinates: 53°36′N 8°03′E

The village of Sengwarden lies north of Wilhelmshaven, Germany. The place was documented for the first time in 1168, was the site of a post-World War II British sector displaced person camp, and since 1972 has been administratively attached to the city Wilhelmshaven. Previously, the municipality belonged to the district Friesland. Sengwarden borders on the Wilhelmshaven suburbs Fedderwarden and Voslapp as well as the Friesland districts of Sillenstede and Hooksiel. Two objects of interest shape the local picture, a mill and the Saint George Church which overlooks on a high bluff. The place is well known for its annual Wilhelmshaven outdoor horse market since 1618. The agriculturally oriented Sengwarden has approximately 1,333 inhabitants.
