= Philanthropinum =

Coordinates: 51°50′17″N 12°14′44″E

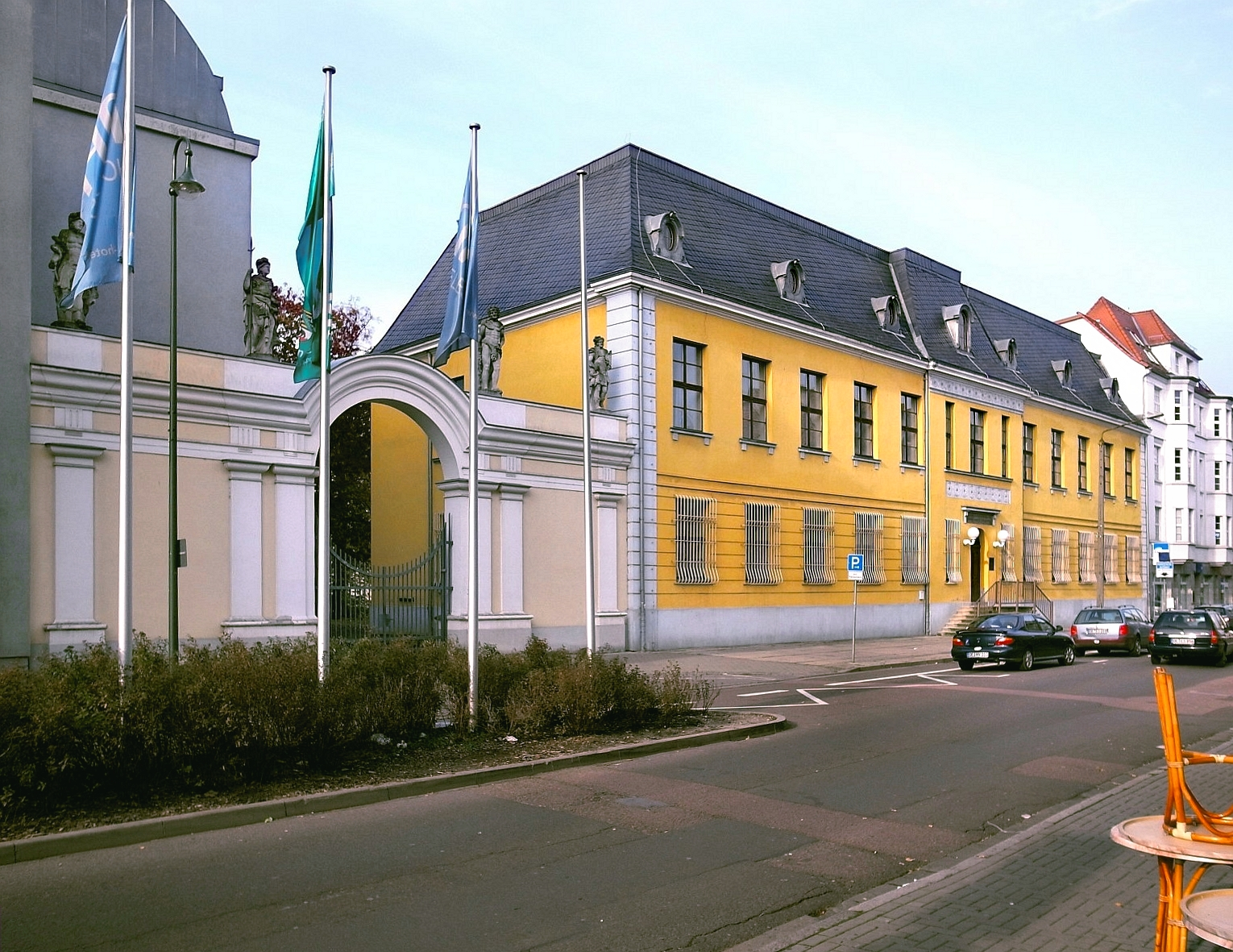
Palais Dietrich, in Dessau, site of the original Philanthropinum

The Philanthropinum (from Greek: φίλος = friend, and άνθρωπος = human) was a reformist, progressive school in Dessau, Germany from 1774 to 1793. It was based on the principles of philanthropinism, an educational movement developed in the German-speaking area during the Age of Enlightenment.

== History ==
The Philanthropinum, or "School of Philanthropy," was founded on 27 December 1774 by the German educational reformers Johann Bernhard Basedow (1724–1790) and Christian Heinrich Wolke (1741–1825). Basedow was influenced by ideas on childhood and education as proposed by John Locke (1632–1704) and Jean-Jacques Rousseau (1712–1778). At the beginning the Philanthropinum had only one teacher and three students, but numbers rapidly grew as its reputation spread beyond Dessau. Prince Franz supported the school, both financially and with his gift of the Palais Dietrich as a venue.

The Philanthropinum was, apart from Basedow and Wolke, also shaped by reformers such as Ernst Christian Trapp (1745–1818), the first Professor of Education, and Christian Gotthilf Salzmann (1744–1811). From 1779 to 1787, August Friedrich Wilhelm Crome (1753–1833) worked at the school. Artist Carl Wilhelm Kolbe (1759–1835) taught art and French at the school from 1780 to 1782 and 1782 to 1784. Basedow and Wolke tried to persuade businessman and educational pioneer Johann Peter Hundeiker (1751–1836) to teach at the school – he turned down their request, but went on to found his own school in Vechelde near Braunschweig inspired by the Dessau model. Poet Friedrich von Matthisson and artist Friedrich Rehberg also found employment here.

In 1776, Basedow stepped down as head of the institution. His successor was Joachim Heinrich Campe (1746–1818), but he quit in 1777 due to conflict with the younger teachers, and went on to found a similar school in Hamburg. Afterwards the school was run by a board of directors. In 1777, Prince Franz made parts of the Palais Dietrich available for the use of the school, and from 1780 to 1793 the school was allowed to occupy the entire palace.

The first three students included Prince Frederick of Anhalt-Dessau (1769–1814). At its peak in 1782–83, the Philanthropinum had 53 pupils, usually from families with enlightened parents, some of whom came from western, northern and eastern Europe. Immanuel Kant was a great supporter of the school, calling for a "quick revolution" in education rather than "slow reform".

In 1793, the Philanthropinum closed, quietly, after the number of students decreased greatly. The concept behind the school, however, was the model for a large number of similar establishments; in Germany alone, over 60 similar schools were founded: For example, Carl Gottfried Neuendorf (1750–1798), who had taught for a while at the Philanthropinum, went on to found the "Hauptschule" in Dessau in 1786; Christian Gotthilf Salzmann (1744–1811) founded another school in Schnepfenthal. Other similar institutions were to be found in France, Switzerland, Russia and North America.

== Curriculum and philosophy ==
Admission of students to the school was regardless of sex, religion or state. Though education for all was the ideal, notions of class still prevailed, and children from richer families spent more time on academic subjects, while those from less-wealthy backgrounds did more manual work. However, all learnt handicrafts and were expected to take part in games and physical exercise. There was a practical approach to education, which was conceived as serving useful and needful ends, and using practical examples where possible. The natural instincts and interests of the children were directed rather than suppressed, while school uniform was designed to be practical and not restrictive.

== Bibliography ==
- Quick, Robert Hebert. Essays on educational reformers (New York and Chicago, E. L. Kellogg & co, 1896) pp. 144–161.
- Graves, Frank Pierrepont . Great Educators of Three Centuries. Their Work and Its Influence on Modern Education (Macmillan, 1912,) p. 112 ff.
- Cubberley, Ellwood Patterson. Readings in the history of education (Boston, New York etc., Houghton Mifflin Company, 1920) p. 436 ff.
- Jörn Garber (Ed.). "Die Stammutter aller guten Schulen": Das Dessauer Philanthropinum und der deutsche Philanthropismus 1774–1793 (Niemeyer Max Verlag Gmbh, 2008).
