= François de Dainville =

François de Dainville (21 January 1909 – 15 January 1971) was a French geographer, historian and Jesuit priest. He was Professor and Research Director at the École pratique des hautes études since 1963, known for his work in the field of the history of education, and mapping from the 16th to 18th century.

== Biography ==
De Dainville was born in Paris, son of Maurice Oudot of Dainville, an archivist of palaeography, and Henriette Girou of Buzareingues. He obtained his Bachelor of Arts after attending high schools in Draguignan and Montpellier, where he was transferred due to the profession of his father.

In 1928 he joined the Society of Jesus. In addition to his spiritual formation and the traditional theological study, he studied geography at the University of Montpellier under Jules Sion, who supervised his 1939 PhD thesis in human geography.

In 1944 he joined the Editorial team of the Étvdes review. In 1959 he was appointed Professor in the History of Mapping at the École Nationale des Chartes, is a French grande école which specializes in historical sciences. He extended his research interest further into the field of the history of education in the modern era.

== Selected publications ==
- Cartes anciennes de l'église de France: historique, répertoire, guide d'usage, Preface by Gabriel Le Bras, J. Vrin, 1956.
- La géographie des humanistes, Slatkine Reprints, 1969.
- Le Langage des géographes. Terres, signes, couleurs des cartes anciennes, 1500-1800, réédition Picard, 1964, et 2002.
- Tourisme et pastorale, Desclée de Brower, 1965.
- Cartes anciennes du Languedoc, Société languedocienne de géographie, Montpellier, 1968.
- Cartes des places protestantes en 1612, Klincksieck, 1968.
- La Cartographie, reflet de l’histoire, recueil d’articles, Slatkine, 1986.
- Livre d'heures du maître, Beauchesne, 1956
- Le Dauphiné et ses confins, vus par l'ingénieur d'Henri IV, Jean de Beins, Droz, 1968
- La Naissance de l'humanisme moderne, Beauchesne, 1940, réimpression, Slatkine 1969.
- Les Chiffres vous parlent. Géographie et statistique, J. B. Baillière, 1937
- Les Jésuites et l’éducation de la société française. La Géographie des humanistes, Beauchesne, 1940, réimpression Slatkine, 1969).
- L'Éducation des jésuites (XVIe-XVIIIe siècles), Paris, Éditions de Minuit (collection 'Sens commun'), 1978.
