= Christian Gotthilf Salzmann =

German academic

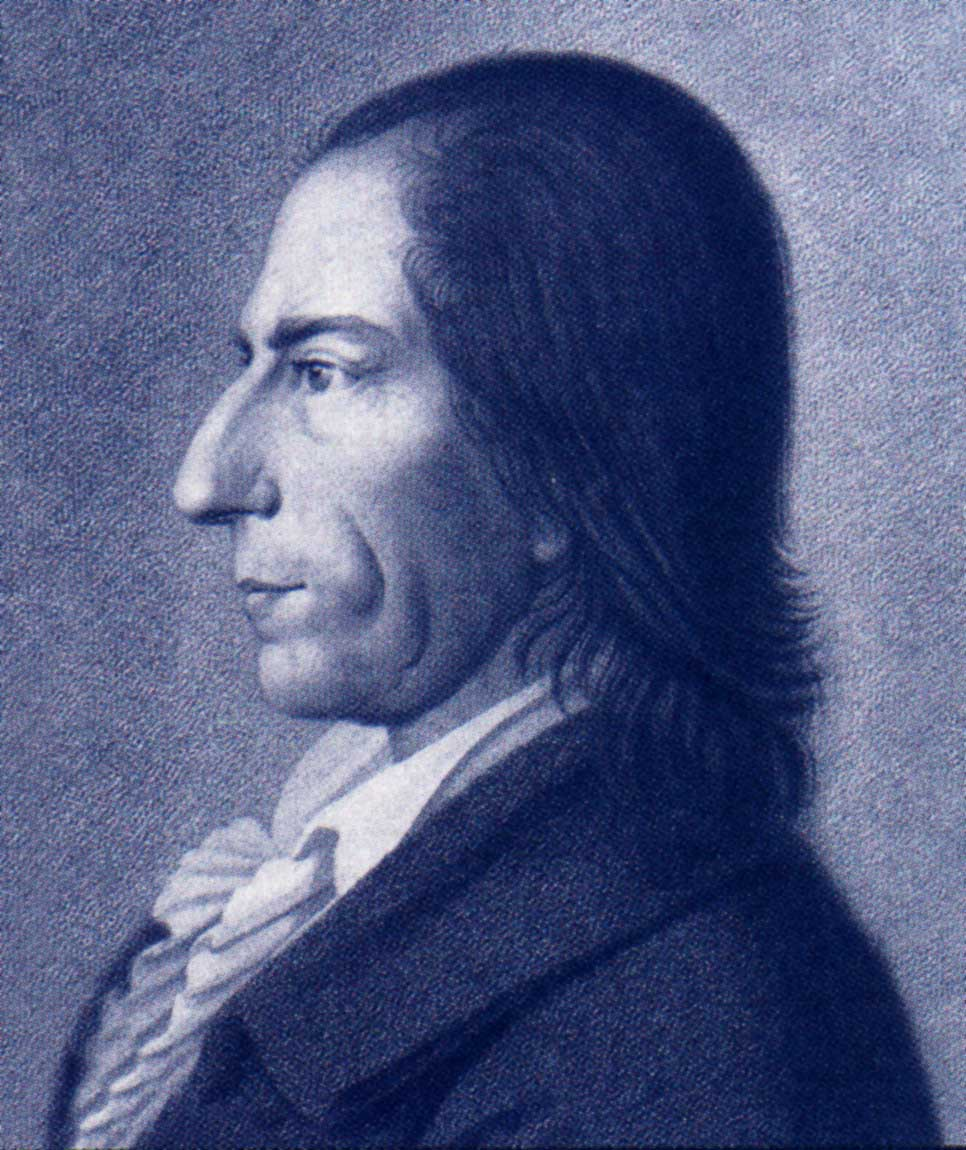
Christian Gotthilf Salzmann

Christian Gotthilf Salzmann (1 July 1744 – 31 October 1811) was a German educational reformer and the founder of the Schnepfenthal institution.

== Life and career ==
Salzmann was born on 1 July 1744 near Erfurt, Thuringia. His father was a Protestant minister, and Salzmann himself trained to become a pastor.

Salzmann wrote Bibliothek für Jünglinge und Mädchen, giving instructions on how to teach religion to children, but it was widely rejected by his superiors. Because of this rejection, he accepted a position at Basedow's Philanthropinum. From there, he continued to write papers about education reform, including his Moralische Elementarbuch in 1783.

In 1785, Salzmann opened his own school, the Schnepfenthal institution, which taught his new brand of practical education. While teaching at the school, he continued to publish works and even issued the periodical Der Bote aus Thüringen.

He died on 31 October 1811.

== Connections to Mary Wollstonecraft ==
Salzmann's work reached the British public as Elements of Morality for the Use of Children (1790-91), under the auspices of the liberal publisher Joseph Johnson. This was written by Mary Wollstonecraft, who began the work as a translation, but "made the stories English, and added and altered where necessary", according to Janet Todd. This translation found a wider readership with a two-part essay in Johnson's Analytical Review. Salzmann's work was further adapted in 1872, when Charlotte Mary Yonge edited a Storehouse of Stories.

According to Henry Crabb Robinson, Salzmann and Wollstonecraft were in correspondence with each other. Salzmann returned her interest by publishing her A Vindication of the Rights of Woman, in German in 1793. The main translation of her magnum opus was performed by one of the teachers at his school, Georg Friedrich Christian Weissenborn, but Salzmann employed the author's licence to make what Robinson called "edifying improvements". Salzmann also published a German version of Memoirs of the Author of A Vindication of the Rights of Woman, written by her widower, William Godwin and again translated by Salzmann's employee Weissenborn. In the prefaces to both these works, he expresses sympathy for her ideas and her life.

== Connections to Freemasons and Illuminati ==
While it is not known whether Salzmann himself was a member of the Freemasons or the Illuminati, his school was supported and funded by members of both groups.

== Selected works ==
- Moralische Elementarbuch (1783)
- Bibliothek für Jünglinge und Mädchen
- Moralischen Erzählungen zur Bildung des Herzens für Knaben und Mädchen
- Gymnastics for Youth
- Rettung der Rechte des Weibes mit Bemerkungen ueber Politische und Moralische Gegenstande von Maria Wollstonecroft (1793) (German translation of A Vindication of the Rights of Woman)
