= Johann Bernhard Basedow =

German educational reformer and philosopher (1724–1790)

- Illustration of Basedow
- Born: 11 September 1724; Hamburg, Holy Roman Empire
- Died: 25 July 1790 (aged 65); Magdeburg, Prussia, Holy Roman Empire
- Occupations: Philosopher; educator

Johann Bernhard Basedow (German pronunciation: [ˈbaːzədo]; 11 September 1724 – 25 July 1790) was a German educational reformer, teacher and writer. He founded the Philanthropinum, a short-lived but influential progressive school in Dessau, and was the author of "Elementarwerk", a popular illustrated textbook for children.

== Early life ==
Basedow was born in Hamburg on 11 September 1723. His father was a wigmaker named Heinrich Basedau, and was described as "severe almost to brutality", and his mother, Anna Maria Leonhard, as suffering from "melancholy almost to madness", which made his childhood a less than happy one. It was planned that he should follow his father's profession, but, at the age of 14, he ran away from home, finding employment as a servant of a country physician in Holstein. His employer recognized Johann's extraordinary intellectual gifts and sent him back home to his parents with a letter which persuaded them to allow their son to be schooled at the Johanneum in Hamburg. Here, Johann came under the influence of the rationalist H.S. Reimarus (1694–1768), author of the famous Wolfenbütteler Fragmente, published by Lessing.

In 1744, Basedow went to the University of Leipzig as a student of theology, but turned instead to the study of philosophy, being particularly influenced by Wolff's "Philosophy of Reason". This made him examine his own Christian faith, arriving at a position that was "in a centre between Christianism and naturalism". Thus, he rejected his clerical vocation and turned instead to radicalism and reformism. He was the grandfather of Karl Adolph von Basedow.

== Teacher and academic ==
Between 1749 and 1753, Basedow was a private tutor to the son of Herr von Quaalen, a nobleman living in Borghorst, Holstein. He developed new teaching methods based on conversation and play with the child, and a program of physical development. Such was his success that he wrote a treatise on his methods, "On the best and hitherto unknown method of teaching children of noblemen", which he presented to the University of Kiel in 1752, and obtained the degree of Master of Arts.

In 1753, he was appointed professor of moral philosophy and belles-lettres at Sorø Academy in Denmark. He proved to be a very popular teacher and was also called on to lecture on Theology. However, his fearless, anti-establishment views and the publication of a book in 1758, "Practische Philosophie" ("Practical Philosophy"), in which he expounded his unorthodox religious position, led, in 1761, to his removal from this post and transfer to Altona; here his published works brought him into conflict with the orthodox clergy. He was forbidden to give further instruction, but did not lose his salary; and, towards the end of 1767, he abandoned theology to devote himself with the same ardour to education, of which he conceived the project of a general reform in Germany.

== The Elementary Book and Philanthropinum ==
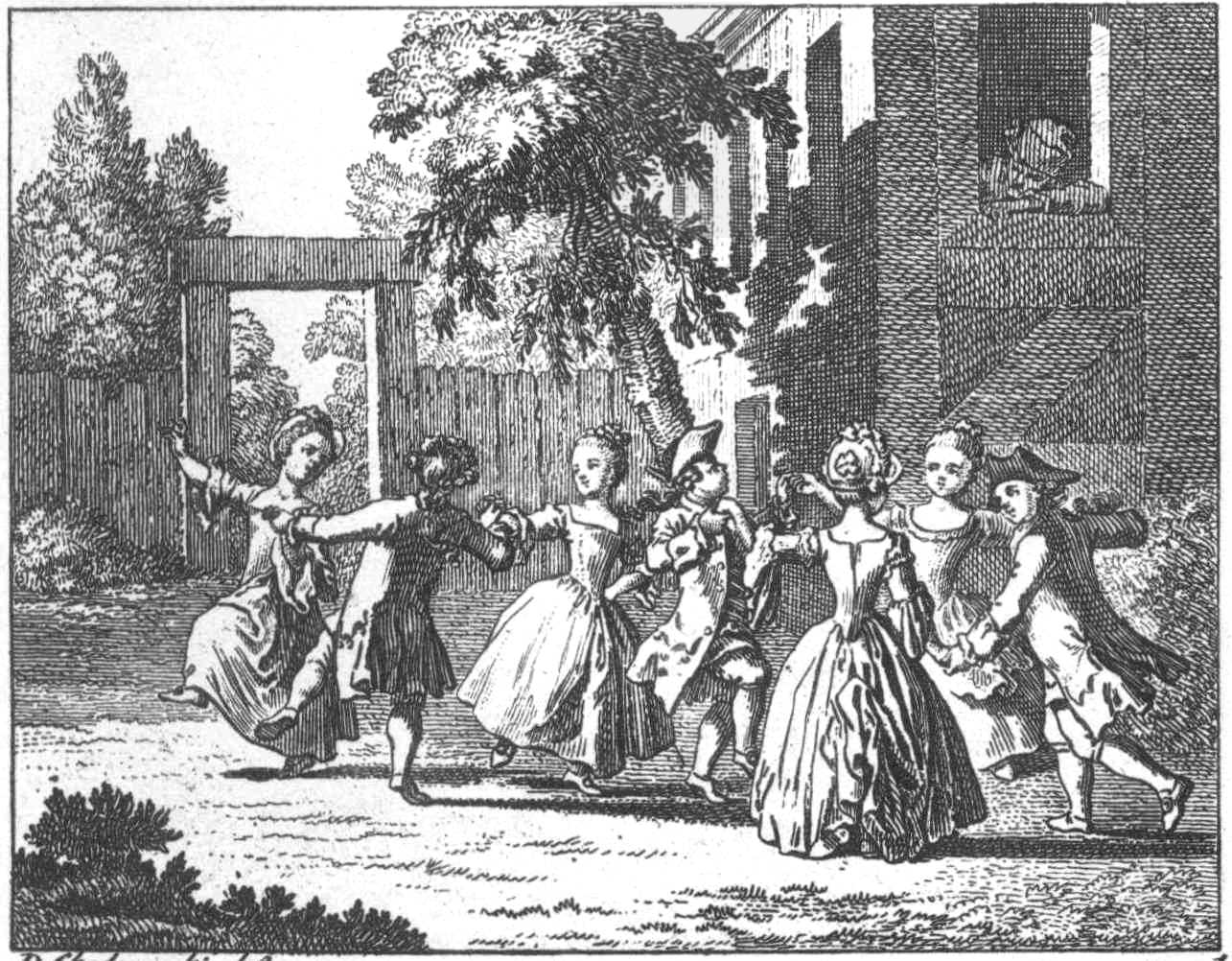
Illustration from "Elementartwerk": Children's amusements, Dancers with Grandfather looking on (1774).

In 1768, strongly influenced by Rousseau's ideas on education in Emile, Basedow published a book, Vorstellung an Menschenfreunde für Schulen, nebst dem Plan eines Elementarbuches der menschlichen Erkenntnisse ("Idea to philanthropists for schools, along with the plan of an elementary book of human knowledge"). He proposed the reform of schools and of the common methods of instruction, the establishment of an institute for qualifying teachers and solicited subscriptions for the printing of a new, illustrated, book, Elementarwerk ("Elementary Book"), where his principles were to be explained at length. He realized it is the responsibility of all of society to support these important education reforms intended to improve the quality of teaching, remove brutal treatment of students in all forms and replace it with compassion and understanding, and the introduction of new teaching materials and books to help students learn. He proposed his reform project to wealthy individuals who he knew were interested in helping humanity and soon received financial support. Initially he gathered over twenty thousand thalers and in 1774 he was able to publish Elementarwerk in four volumes, with illustrations by Daniel Chodowiecki. The Elementarwerk contained a complete system of primary education, intended to develop the intelligence of the pupils and to bring them, so far as possible, into contact with realities, not with mere words; it was the first picture textbook for children to be published since the "Orbis Pictus" of Comenius in 1664. There was also a companion "Methodenbuch" (Method Book) to assist teachers and parents.

This financial support from "friends of humanity" (Philanthropy = love of humanity), established Basedow as the founder of the philanthropic movement and he developed the first philanthropic concept. Philanthropy was integral to the forwarding of the education reform movement and could not have been successful otherwise.

Basedow was a friend of Goethe, and through him made the acquaintance of Prince Franz of Anhalt-Dessau, who became a firm supporter of Basedow's plans for educational reform and agreed to back the founding of a new school, the Philanthropinum, in Dessau. The school opened in December 1774, its keynote being "everything according to nature". Rich and poor were to be educated together, the curriculum was practically based and conducted in German (rather than Latin or Greek), handicrafts were taught, there was an emphasis on games and physical exercise, and school uniform was made simple and more comfortable. Although the school was open for only a relatively short time until 1793, its reforming influence proved to be considerable and inspired the founding of many similar institutions in Germany and abroad.

== Later life ==
Basedow, unfortunately, was not disposed by nature or habit to succeed in an employment which required the greatest regularity, patience and attention; his temper was intractable, and his management of the Philanthropinum was one long quarrel with his colleagues. He resigned his directorship of the institution in 1778. Basedow Married Gertrude Elizabeth Hammer. He had many children including Christine Henriette Louise von Basedow (who died at birth), Antonie Luise Emilie von Basedow, Ludwig von Basedow, and Henriech Josias von Basedow.

Basedow died in Magdeburg in 1790.

== See also ==
- Philanthropinum
- Philanthropinism

== Bibliography ==
Books by Basedow:

- Philalethes: Neue Aussichten in die Wahrheiten und Religion der Vernunft bis in die Gränzen der glaubwürdigen Offenbarung (Iversen, 1764). 2 vols.
- Methodenbuch für Väter und Mütter der Familien und Völker Altoona and Bremen, 1770 (3rd Ed. Dessau, 1773). 3rd edition translated as Method Book for Fathers and Mothers of Families and Nations in J. B. Basedow and F.S. Bock on Pedagogy: Translations of Two 18th-Century Textbooks, edited, translated, and annotated by Robert B. Louden, London, New York: Bloomsbury Academic (2025).
- Johann Bernhard Basedows bewiesene Grundsätze der reinen Mathematik: bd. Geometrie und etwas von dem unendlichen (Bey S. L. Crusius, 1774).
- Bernhards aus Nordalbingien (oder Basedows) Vermächtniss für die Gewissen (Gedruckt bey Heinrich Heybruch, 1774).
- Praktische Philosophie für alle Stände (Crusius, 1777). 2 vols.

About Basedow and his work:

- Meier, Johann Christian. Johann Bernhard Basedow: Leben Charakter und Schriften (Hoffmann, 1791). 2 vols.
- Rathmann, Heinrich. Beiträge zur Lebensgeschichte Joh. Bernh. Basedows (Pansa, 1791)
- Lang, Ossian Herbert. Basedow, his educational work and principles (New York, Kellogg, 1891).
- Quick, Robert Hebert. Essays on educational reformers (New York D. Appleton, 1893) pp. 273–289.
- Diestelmann, Richard. Johann Bernhard Basedow (R. Voigtländer's Verlag, 1897).
- Swet, Kurt. Beiträge zur lebensgeschichte und pädagogik Joh. Bernh. Basedows (Zwickau, Druck von C. A. Günther nachfolger, 1898).
- Graves, Frank Pierrepont. Great Educators of Three Centuries. Their Work and Its Influence on Modern Education (Macmillan, 1912, ) p. 112 ff.
- Duggan, Stephen. A student's textbook in the history of education (New York, D. Appleton, 1916) pp. 216–9.
- Cubberley, Ellwood Patterson. Readings in the history of education (Boston, New York [etc.] Houghton Mifflin Company, 1920) pp. 436–9.
- Reble, A. Johann Bernhard Basedow (Schöningh, 1965).
