= Diagram =

Symbolic representation of information using visualization techniques

A diagram is a symbolic representation of information using visualization techniques. Diagrams have been used since prehistoric times on walls of caves, but became more prevalent during the Enlightenment. Sometimes, the technique uses a three-dimensional visualization technique which then become projected onto a two-dimensional surface.

== Overview ==
The term "diagram" in its commonly used sense can have a general or specific meaning:

- visual information device : Like the term "illustration", "diagram" is used as a collective term standing for the whole class of technical genres, including graphs, technical drawings and tables.
- specific kind of visual display : This is the genre that shows qualitative data with shapes that are connected by lines, arrows, or other visual links.

In science the term is used in both ways. For example, Anderson (1997) stated more generally: "diagrams are pictorial, yet abstract, representations of information, and maps, line graphs, bar charts, engineering blueprints, and architects' sketches are all examples of diagrams, whereas photographs and video are not". On the other hand, Lowe (1993) defined diagrams as specifically "abstract graphic portrayals of the subject matter they represent".

In the specific sense diagrams and charts contrast with computer graphics, technical illustrations, infographics, maps, and technical drawings, by showing "abstract rather than literal representations of information". The essence of a diagram can be seen as:

- a form of visual formatting devices
- a display that does not show quantitative data (numerical data), but rather relationships and abstract information
- with building blocks such as geometrical shapes connected by lines, arrows, or other visual links.

Or in Hall's (1996) words "diagrams are simplified figures, caricatures in a way, intended to convey essential meaning". These simplified figures are often based on a set of rules. The basic shape according to White (1984) can be characterized in terms of "elegance, clarity, ease, pattern, simplicity, and validity". Elegance is basically determined by whether or not the diagram is "the simplest and most fitting solution to a problem".

== Diagrammatology ==
Diagrammatology is the academic study of diagrams. Scholars note that while a diagram may look similar to the thing that it represents, this is not necessary. Rather a diagram may only have structural similarity to what it represents, an idea often attributed to Charles Sanders Peirce. Structural similarity can be defined in terms of a mapping between parts of the diagram and parts of what the diagram represents and the properties of this mapping, such as maintaining relations between these parts and facts about these relations. This is related to the concept of isomorphism, or homomorphism in mathematics.

Sometimes certain geometric properties (such as which points are closer) of the diagram can be mapped to properties of the thing that a diagram represents. On the other hand, the representation of an object in a diagram may be overly specific and properties that are true in the diagram may not be true for the object the diagram represents. A diagram may act as a means of cognitive extension allowing reasoning to take place on the diagram based on which constraints are similar.

== Gallery of diagram types ==
There are at least the following types of diagrams:

=== Logical ===
- Logical or conceptual diagrams, which take a collection of items and relationships between them, and express them by giving each item a 2D position, while the relationships are expressed as connections between the items or overlaps between the items, for example:
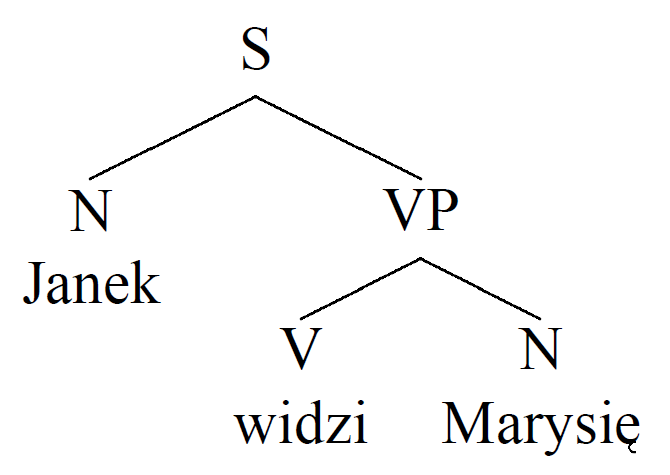
tree diagram

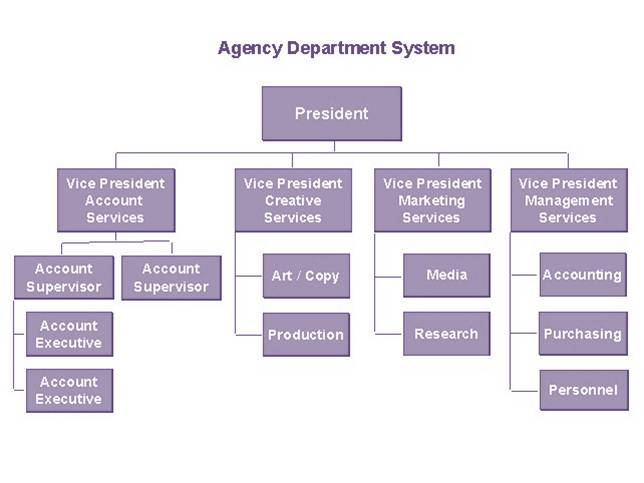
Organigram

Network diagram

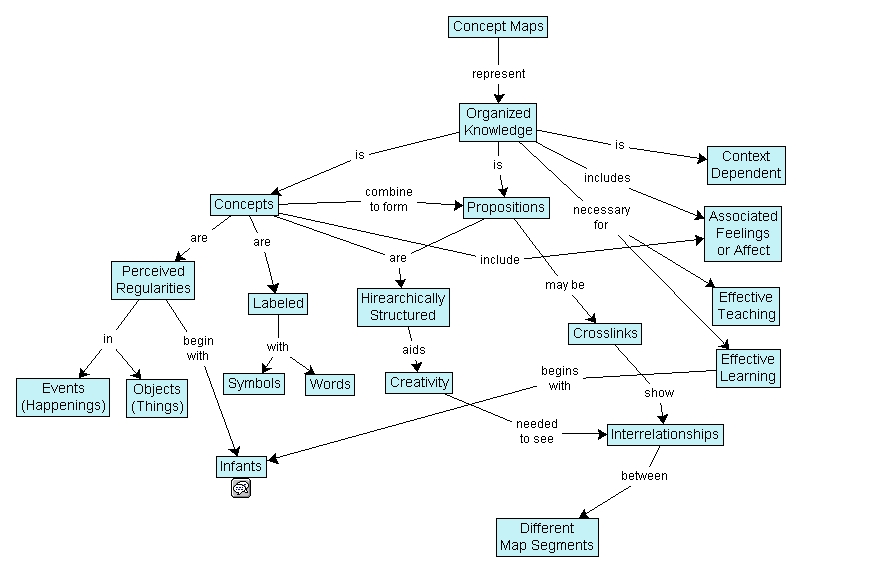
Concept map

Flowchart

Venn diagram

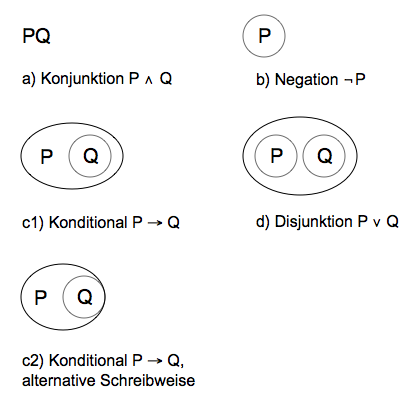
Existential graph

Fishbone diagram

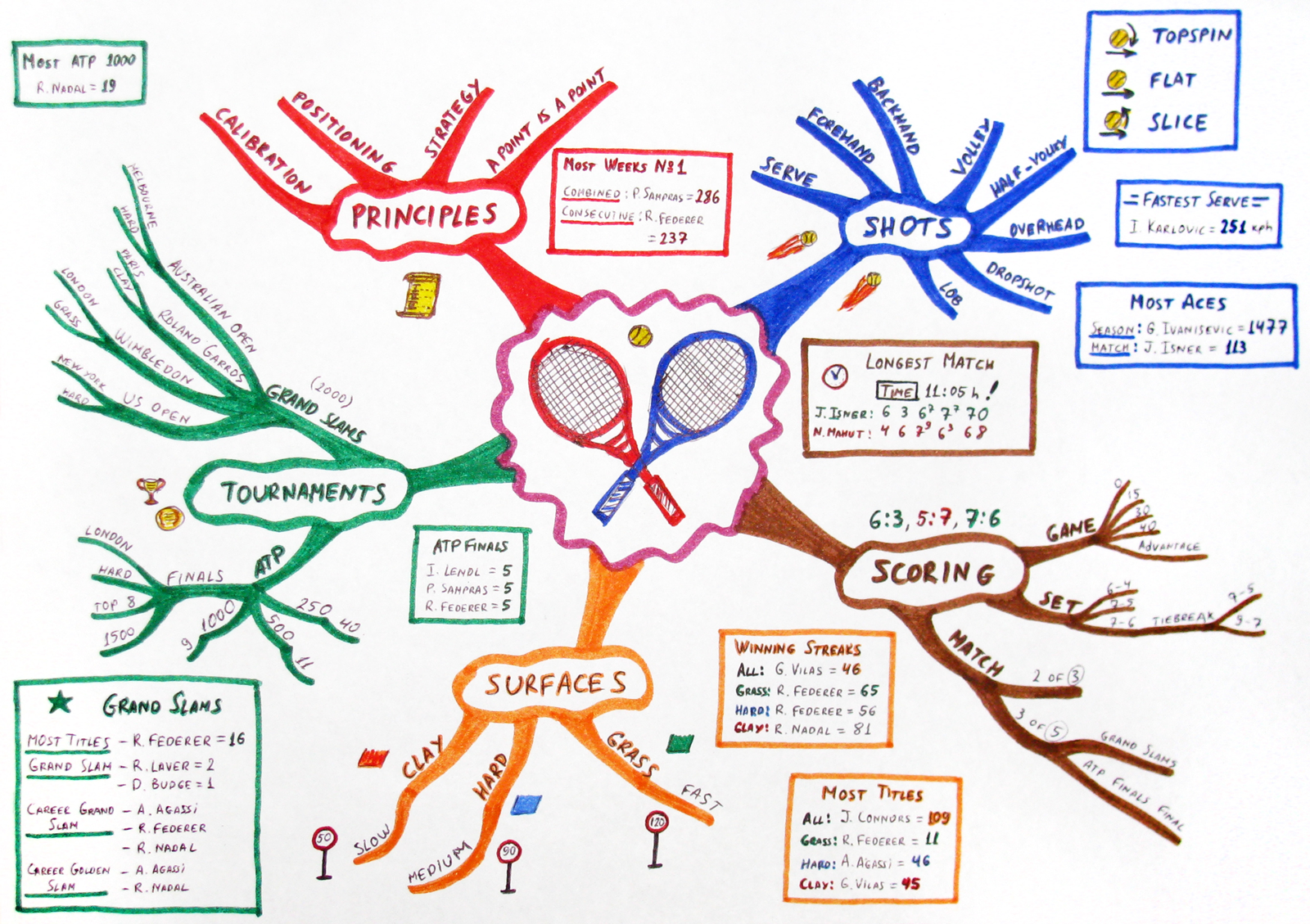
Mind map

=== Quantitative ===
- Quantitative diagrams, which display a relationship between two variables that take either discrete or a continuous range of values; for example:
Function graph

Scatter plot

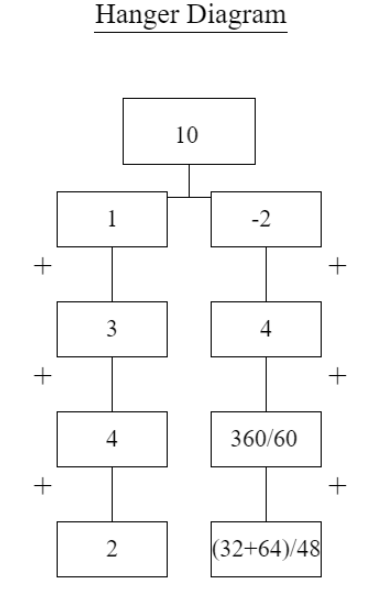
Hanger diagram.

=== Schematic ===
- Schematics are representation of systems or objects using abstract graphic symbols and illustrations, for example:
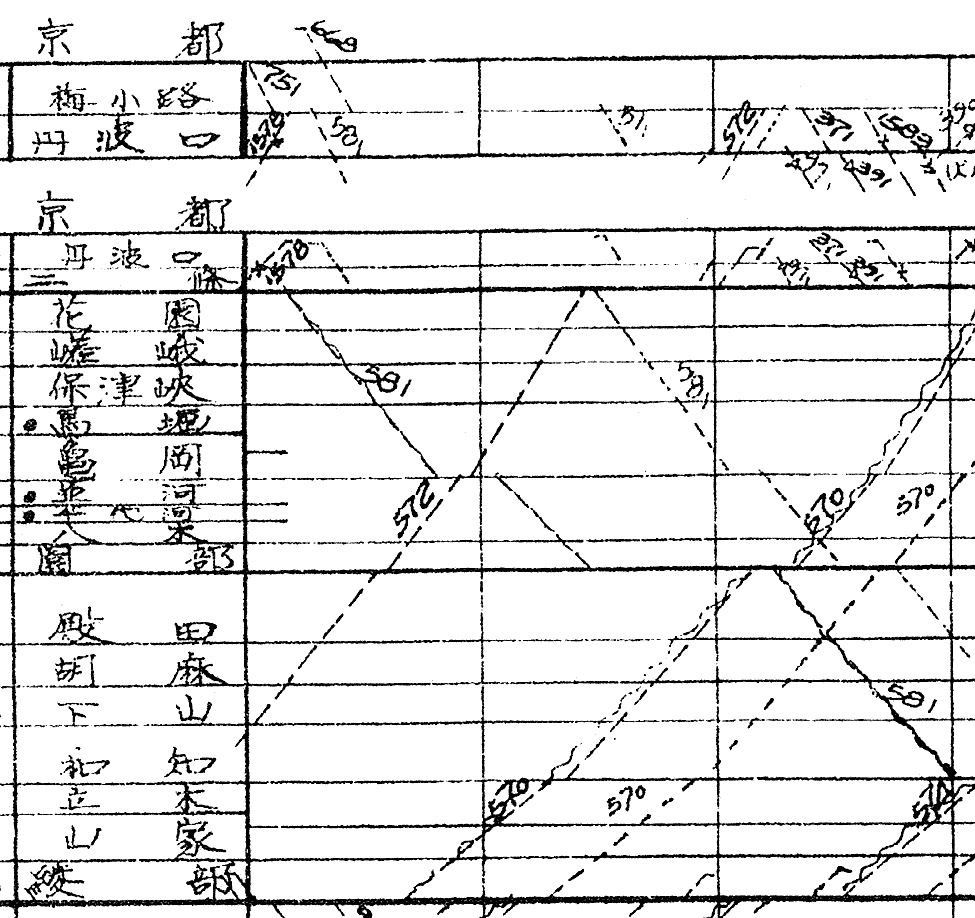
Time–distance diagram

Exploded view

Pioneer plaque

Three-dimensional diagram

Composition diagram

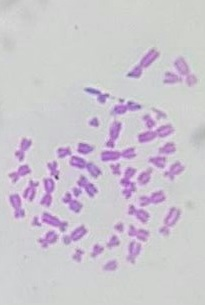
Photomicrograph of the human chromosomes

Schematic diagram of the same.

Many of these types of diagrams are commonly generated using diagramming software such as Visio and Gliffy.

Diagrams may also be classified according to use or purpose, for example, explanatory and/or how to diagrams.

There is also Interpretation of Design Appearance of Structures built in cities as for example Highrises which are called Diagram. Normally they are 1 pixel per 1 m in Height, simulating in proportion what is or was found in reality. Here some examples:

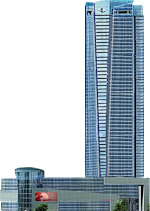

Guangzhou Bay Times Square 211.2m High 2015 Floors 56 Office Retail Mall Hotel Zhanjiang GD China, Stale Proposed

Q Sentra 190 m High 2011-2015 Floors 49 Kuala Lumpur Malaysia, Built

Train Station Building 73m High 1991-2007 Floors 22 Hotel Office Retail Shinan District Qingdao SD China, Destroyed

Thousands of diagram techniques exist. Some more examples follow:

== Specific diagram types ==
A

- Activity diagram used in UML 6/9 and SysML

B

- Bachman diagram
- Booch – used in software engineering
- Bow-tie diagram
- Block diagram
- Bond graph
- Business Process Diagram

C

- Carroll diagram
- Cartogram
- Catalytic cycle
- Computer network diagram
- Chemical equation
- Curly arrow diagram
- Category theory diagrams
- Cause-and-effect diagram
- Chord diagram (disambiguation)
- Circuit diagram
- Class diagram – from UML 1/9
- Cobweb diagram
- Collaboration diagram – from UML 2.0
- Communication diagram – from UML 2.0
- Commutative diagram
- Comparison diagram
- Component diagram – from UML 3/9
- Composite structure diagram – from UML 2.0
- Concept map
- Constellation diagram
- Context diagram
- Control-flow diagram
- Cross functional flowchart

D

- Data-model diagram
- Data-flow diagram
- Data-structure diagram
- Dendrogram
- Dependency diagram
- Deployment diagram – from UML 9/9
- Dynkin diagram
- Dot and cross diagram
- Double bubble map – used in education
- Drakon-chart

E

- Entity–relationship diagram (ERD)
- Event-driven process chain
- Euler diagram
- Eye diagram – a diagram of a received telecommunications signal
- Exploded-view drawing
- Express-G

F

- Family tree
- Feynman diagram
- Flow chart
- Flow process chart
- Flow diagram
- Free body diagram

G

- Gantt chart – shows the timing of tasks or activities (used in project management)
- Grotrian diagram
- Goodman diagram – shows the fatigue data (example: for a wind turbine blades)

H

- Hasse diagram
- HIPO diagram

I

- Internal block diagram (IBD) used in SysML
- IDEF0
- IDEF1 (entity relations)
- Interaction overview diagram – from UML
- Ishikawa diagram

J

- Jackson diagram
- Jones diagram

K

- Karnaugh map
- Kinematic diagram
- Knot diagram

L

- Ladder diagram
- Levi graph
- Line of balance
- Link grammar diagram

M

- Message sequence chart
- Mind map – used for learning, brainstorming, memory, visual thinking and problem solving
- Minkowski spacetime diagram
- Molecular orbital diagram
- Motion diagram

N

- N2
- Nassi–Shneiderman diagram or structogram – a representation for structured programming
- Nomogram
- Network diagram

O

- O–C diagram – a diagnostic plot of observed minus predicted values over time
- Object diagram – from UML 2/9
- Organigram
- Onion diagram – also known as "stacked Venn diagram"

P

- Package diagram from UML 4/9 and SysML
- Parametric diagram from SysML
- PERT
- Petri net – shows the structure of a distributed system as a directed bipartite graph with annotations
- Phylogenetic tree - represents a phylogeny (evolutionary relationships among groups of organisms)
- Piping and instrumentation diagram (P&ID)
- Phase diagram used to present solid/liquid/gas information
- Plant diagram
- Pressure volume diagram used to analyse engines
- Pourbaix diagram
- Process flow diagram or PFD – used in chemical engineering
- Program structure diagram

R

- Radar chart
- Radial diagram
- Requirement diagram Used in SysML
- Rich picture
- R-diagram
- Routing diagram

S

- Sankey diagram – represents material, energy or cost flows with quantity proportional arrows in a process network
- Sentence diagram – represents the grammatical structure of a natural language sentence
- Sequence diagram from UML 8/9 and SysML
- Single-line diagram
- SDL/GR diagram – specification and description Language. SDL is a formal language used in computer science.
- Smith chart
- Spider chart
- Spray diagram
- SSADM – structured systems analysis and design methodology (used in software engineering)
- Star chart/Celestial sphere
- State diagram are used for state machines in software engineering from UML 7/9
- Structural formula
- Swim lane
- Syntax diagram used in software engineering to represent a context-free grammar
- Systems Biology Graphical Notation – a graphical notation used in diagrams of biochemical and cellular processes studied in systems biology
- System context diagram
- System structure
- Systematic layout planning

T

- Timing diagram: digital timing diagram
- Timing diagram: UML 2.0
- Timeline
- TQM Diagram
- Tree structure
- Treemap

U

- UML diagram – Unified Modeling Language (used in software engineering)
- Use case diagram – from UML 5/9 and SysML

V

- Value stream mapping
- Venn diagram
- Violin plot
- Voronoi diagram

W

- Warnier-Orr
- Wedge-dash diagram
- Williot diagram

Y

- Yourdon-Coad – see Edward Yourdon, used in software engineering

== See also ==
- commons:Specific diagram types – Gallery of many diagram types at Wikimedia Commons
- Argument map – Visual representation of the structure of an argument
- Chart – Graphical representation of data
- Data and information visualization – Visual representation of data
- List of diagramming software
- Diagrammatic reasoning – Reasoning by means of visual representations
- Diagrammatology – Academic study of diagrams
- Experience model
- JavaScript graphics libraries – Libraries for creating diagrams and other data visualization
- List of graphical methods
- Mathematical diagram – Visual representation of a mathematical relationship
- PGF/TikZ – Graphics languages
- Plot (graphics) – Graphical technique for data sets
- Table (information) – Arrangement of information or data, typically in rows and columns
