= D810 =

D810 may refer to:

- Nikon D810, a full-frame digital single-lens reflex camera
- Dell Latitude D810, a laptop computer
