= Two-dimensional graph =

A two-dimensional graph may refer to

- The graph of a function of one variable
- A planar graph
- A diagram in a plane
