= Nikon D850 =

Digital single-lens reflex camera

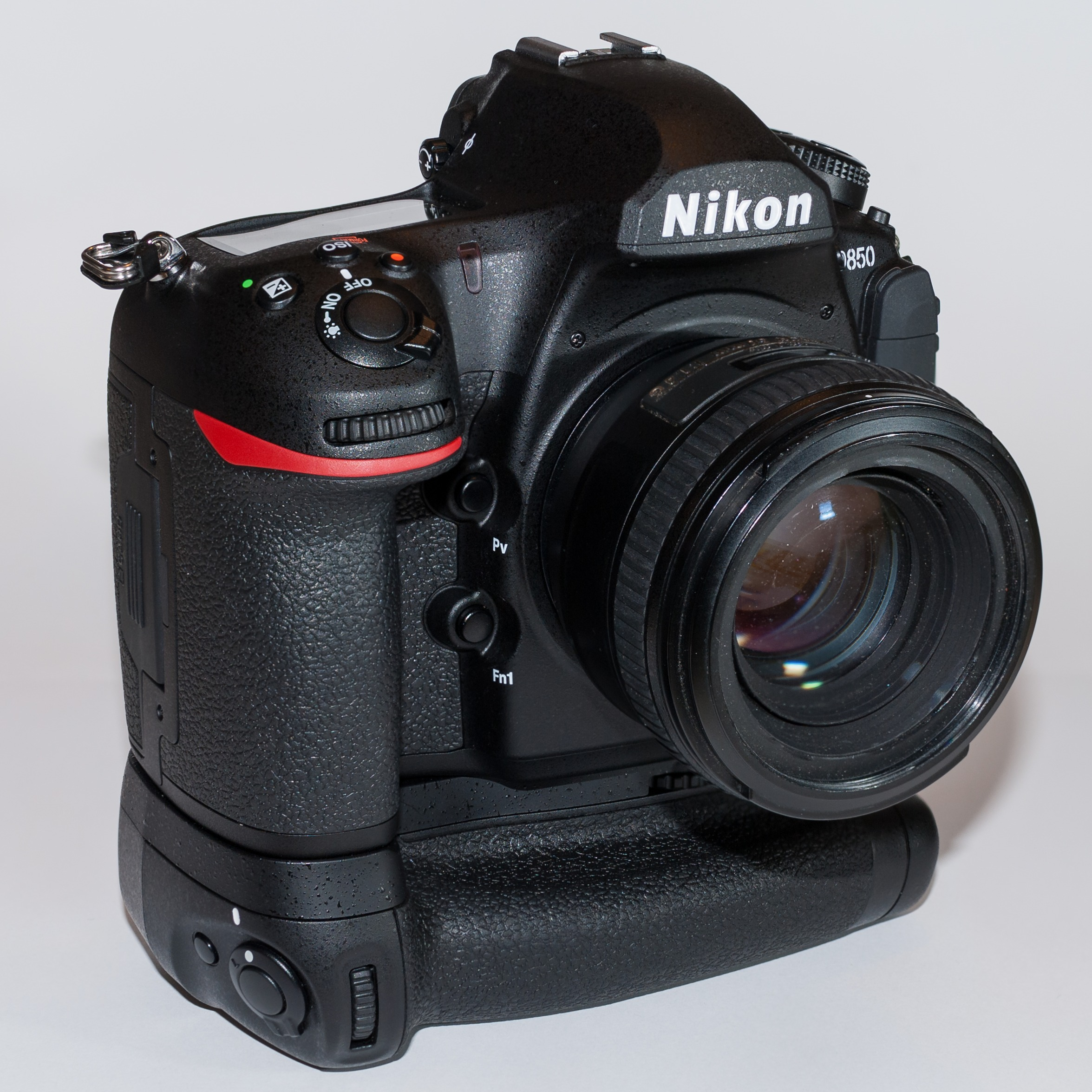
- A Nikon D850 camera with attached optional MB-D18 battery grip

Overview
- Maker: Nikon
- Type: Digital single-lens reflex
- Released: 24 August 2017

Lens
- Lens: Interchangeable, Nikon F-mount

Sensor/medium
- Sensor: 45.4 megapixels (8,256 × 5,504) Nikon FX format
- Sensor type: CMOS BSI
- Sensor size: 35.9 mm x 23.9 mm, 4.35 μm pixel size
- Film speed: 64–25,600 in 1, 1/2 or 1/3 EV steps (down to 32 and up to 102,400 as expansion)
- Recording medium: Dual Card slots: One XQD/CFe slot and the second slot supporting SD/SDHC/SDXC

Focusing
- Focus modes: Single-servo AF (AF-S); Continuous-servo AF (AF-C); auto AF-S/AF-C selection (AF-A), manual (M)
- Focus areas: Multi-CAM 20K autofocus sensor module with TTL phase detection and fine-tuning, and 153 focus points (including 99 cross-type sensors and 15 sensors that support f/8)

Exposure/metering
- Exposure modes: Programmed Auto [P] with flexible program; Shutter-Priority Auto [S]; Aperture-Priority Auto [A]; Manual [M]
- Exposure metering: TTL exposure metering using approximately 180K (180,000) pixels RGB sensor

Flash
- Flash: No

Shutter
- Shutter: Electronically controlled vertical-travel focal-plane mechanical shutter Electronic front-curtain shutter available in quiet shutter-release, quiet continuous shutter-release, and mirror up release modes
- Shutter speed range: 30 s – 1/8000 s, bulb
- Continuous shooting: 7 frames/sec or 9 frames/sec with a battery grip, up to 51 frames (raw) in 14-bit lossless. 170 in 12-bit lossless

Viewfinder
- Viewfinder: Optical, 100% frame coverage

General
- Video recording: 4K up to 30 fps 1080p up to 60 fps
- LCD screen: 3.2-inch tilting TFT LCD with 2.359 million dots with touchscreen
- Battery: EN-EL15a
- Dimensions: 146×124×78.5 mm (5.75×4.88×3.09 in)
- Weight: 915 g (32 oz) (2.017 lb) (body only); 1,005 g (2.216 lb) (including battery)
- Latest firmware: 1.31 / 25 April 2024; 2 years ago
- Made in: Thailand

Chronology
- Predecessor: Nikon D810
- Successor: Nikon Z8

The Nikon D850 is a professional-grade full-frame digital single-lens reflex camera (DSLR) produced by Nikon. The camera was officially announced on July 25, 2017 (the 100th anniversary of Nikon's founding), launched on August 24, 2017, and first shipped on September 8, 2017. Nikon announced it could not fill the preorders on August 28, 2017 and filled less than 10% of preorders on the first shipping day. It is the successor to the Nikon D810.

The D850 is the first Nikon DSLR featuring a back-illuminated image sensor claiming overall a one-stop image quality (image noise) improvement. This camera was the first full frame DSLR achieving 100 points at Dxomark. The D850 also won Camera of the Year for 2017 at Imaging Resource.

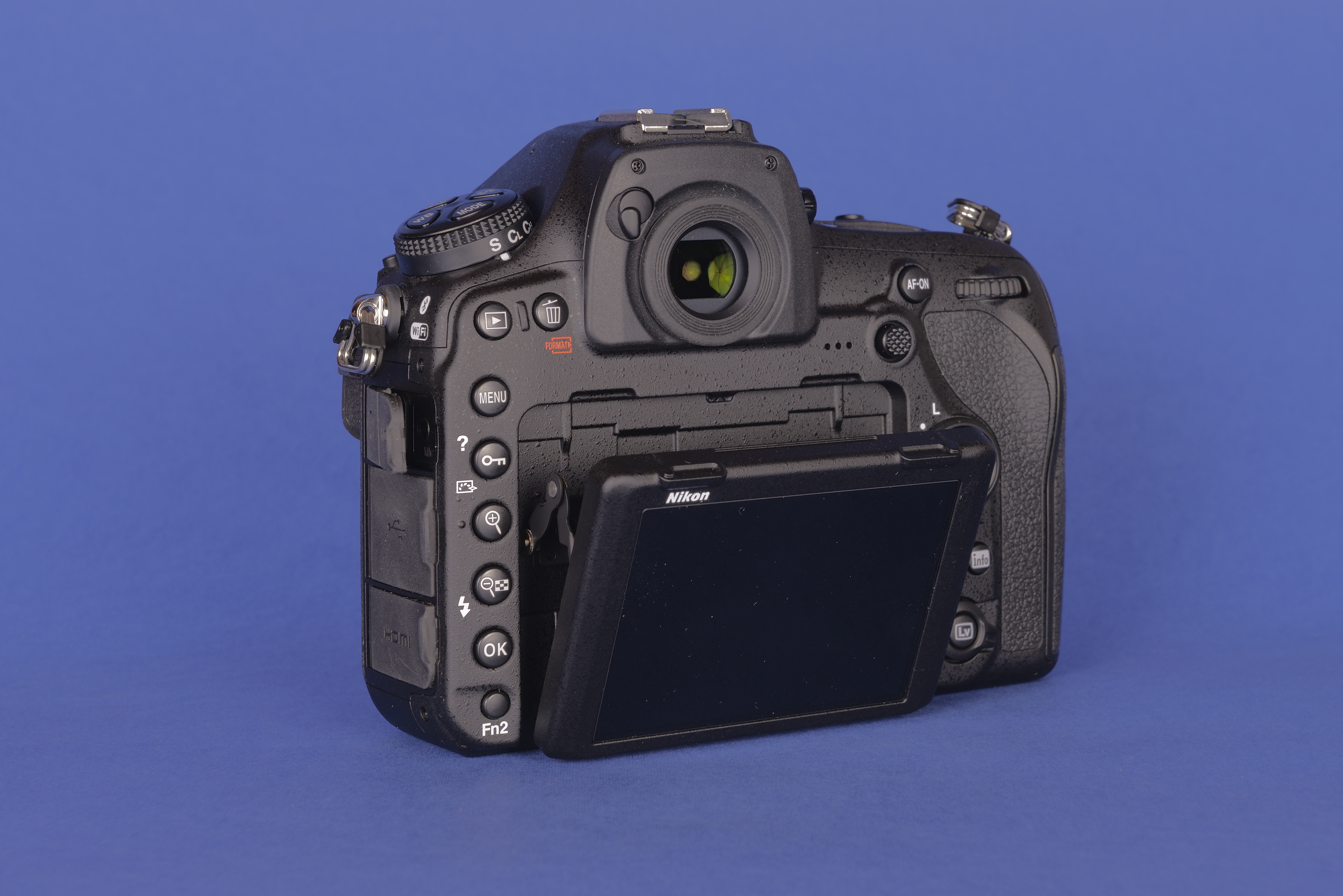
Rear of the camera with articulating screen

== Features ==
Logo for Nikon D850

- Nikon FX format 45.7 megapixel back-illuminated (BSI) CM sensor
- 4K UHD video in 30p, 25p, and 24p uncropped in MOV or MP4 encoding and simultaneously uncompressed (HDMI 2.0). New focus peaking aid.
- Slow motion video with up to 120 frames-per-second (fps) in 1080p
- Electronic image stabilization (vibration reduction, VR) in 1080p DX format video. This has shown a strong effect in practice.
- New viewfinder with 100% frame coverage and 0.75× magnification
- Nikon EXPEED5 image processor
- Active D-Lighting (five levels) for the first time also in video
- 180K pixel RGB metering system.
- Highlight-weighted metering preventing blown highlights or underexposed shadows. Additionally Highlight Display with Zebra Stripes and full aperture metering during live view and video
- Multi-CAM 20K autofocus module with TTL phase detection and fine-tuning, and 153 focus points (including 99 cross-type sensors and 15 sensors that support f/8), of which 55 (35 cross-type sensors and 9 f/8) sensors) are available for selection. Autofocus sensor joystick selector.
- Focus-shift mode (stacking) with special macro mode to shoot a sequence of up to 300 frames
- Live view mode with new Pinpoint autofocus
- Silent Photography mode in live view with up to 6 fps
- 8K resolution or 4k Ultra HD silent timelapse video / intervalometer controlled mode up to 9999 frames
- Built-in image sensor cleaning
- 7 fps continuous shooting for up to 51 raw images (14-bit lossless raw). Buffer jumps to 170 shots in 12-bit lossless raw. Can shoot 9 frames/s with optional battery grip and larger EN-EL18 battery.
- 3.2 inch 2.359-million dot tilting LCD touchscreen
- ISO 64–25600, selectable in 0.3, 0.5, 0.7, 1, or 2-stop increments. ISO expansion increases the range to 32–102400.
- Retouch Menu: D-Lighting, Distortion Control, Filter Effects, Image Overlay, Monochrome, NEF (raw), Processing, Perspective Control, Red-Eye Correction, Resize, Side-by-Side Comparison, Straighten, Trim, Trim Movie
- Selectable in-camera ISO noise reduction applied in post-processing
- New fast batch processing of many NEF (raw) images
- No Built-in flash, but an optional wireless radio flash control (like the Nikon D5 and Nikon D500) allows control of compatible external flashes.
- Film negative scanner with optional ES-2 Film Digitizing Adapter
- File formats include JPEG, TIFF, NEF (Nikon's raw image format compressed, lossless compressed and uncompressed), and JPEG+NEF (JPEG size/quality selectable)
- Dual memory card slots - XQD / CFexpress slot and a SD / SDHC/ SDXC slot. SD slot is UHS-II compliant. (CFexpress support was added with firmware version 1.20.)
- Wi-Fi and Bluetooth Low Energy
  - Initially, the D850's Wi-Fi only worked with Nikon's proprietary "SnapBridge" app. In May 2019, a firmware update opened up the Wi-Fi to third party applications.
- Button illumination
- Magnesium alloy body with weather sealing
- No optical low-pass filter

== Reception ==
External media

Images
- Nikon D850 sample, review and user images, >40MPix. Google Image search
- Nikon D850 images >30MPix at Flickr

Video
- Nikon D850 4k UHD sample, review and user videos: Google search
- Nikon D850 4k UHD sample, review and user videos: Youtube
- Timelapse Nikon D850 8k UHD sample, review and user videos: Google search

The D850 was awarded best Professional DSLR camera at the 2018 TIPA World Awards.

The D850 is also the first DSLR camera to achieve 100 points on the DxOMark sensor review.

The Verge and Fstoppers have compared the Nikon D850 favourably to the Canon 5D Mark IV. A wildlife photography needs (autofocus, noise, speed) review favours the D850 compared to other Nikons with special regard to the new viewfinder.

Comparisons with the Nikon D810 or Nikon D800E show significant image noise improvement.

The D850 won Camera Grand Prix Readers Award and Editors Award in 2018.

Sensor	Class	1999	2000	2001	2002	2003	2004	2005	2006	2007	2008	2009	2010	2011	2012	2013	2014	2015	2016	2017	2018	2019	2020	2021	2022	2023	2024	2025	2026
FX (Full-frame)	Flagship											D3X ^{−P}																	
FX (Full-frame)	Flagship										D3 ^{−P}		D3S ^{−P}		D4		D4S		D5^{T}					D6^{T}					
FX (Full-frame)	Professional											D700 ^{−P}			D800/D800E			D810/D810A			D850 ^{AT}								
FX (Full-frame)	Enthusiast																Df												
FX (Full-frame)	Enthusiast																	D750 ^{A}					D780 ^{AT}						
FX (Full-frame)	Enthusiast															D600	D610												
DX (APS-C)	Flagship		D1^{−E}	D1X^{−E}				D2X^{−E}		D2Xs^{−E}																			
DX (APS-C)	Flagship		D1^{−E}	D1H ^{−E}			D2H^{−E}	D2Hs^{−E}																					
DX (APS-C)	Professional				D100^{−E}				D200^{−E}		D300^{−P}		D300S^{−P}						D500 ^{AT}										
DX (APS-C)	Enthusiast						D70^{−E}		D70s^{−E}	D80^{−E}		D90^{−E}		D7000 ^{−P}			D7100	D7200			D7500 ^{AT}								
DX (APS-C)	Upper-entry								D50^{−E}	D40X^{−E*}	D60^{−E*}		D5000^{A−P*}		D5100^{A−P*}	D5200^{A−P*}	D5300^{A*}	D5500^{AT*}		D5600 ^{AT*}									
DX (APS-C)	Entry-level									D40^{−E*}			D3000^{−E*}	D3100^{−P*}		D3200^{−P*}	D3300^{*}			D3400^{*}		D3500^{*}							
Early models		SVC (prototype; 1986); QV-1000C (1988); NASA F4 (1991); E2/E2S (1995); E2N/E2NS (1996); E3/E3S (1998)																											
Sensor	Class																												
Sensor	Class	1999	2000	2001	2002	2003	2004	2005	2006	2007	2008	2009	2010	2011	2012	2013	2014	2015	2016	2017	2018	2019	2020	2021	2022	2023	2024	2025	2026
