= Nikon D810 =

2014 full-frame digital single-lens reflex camera

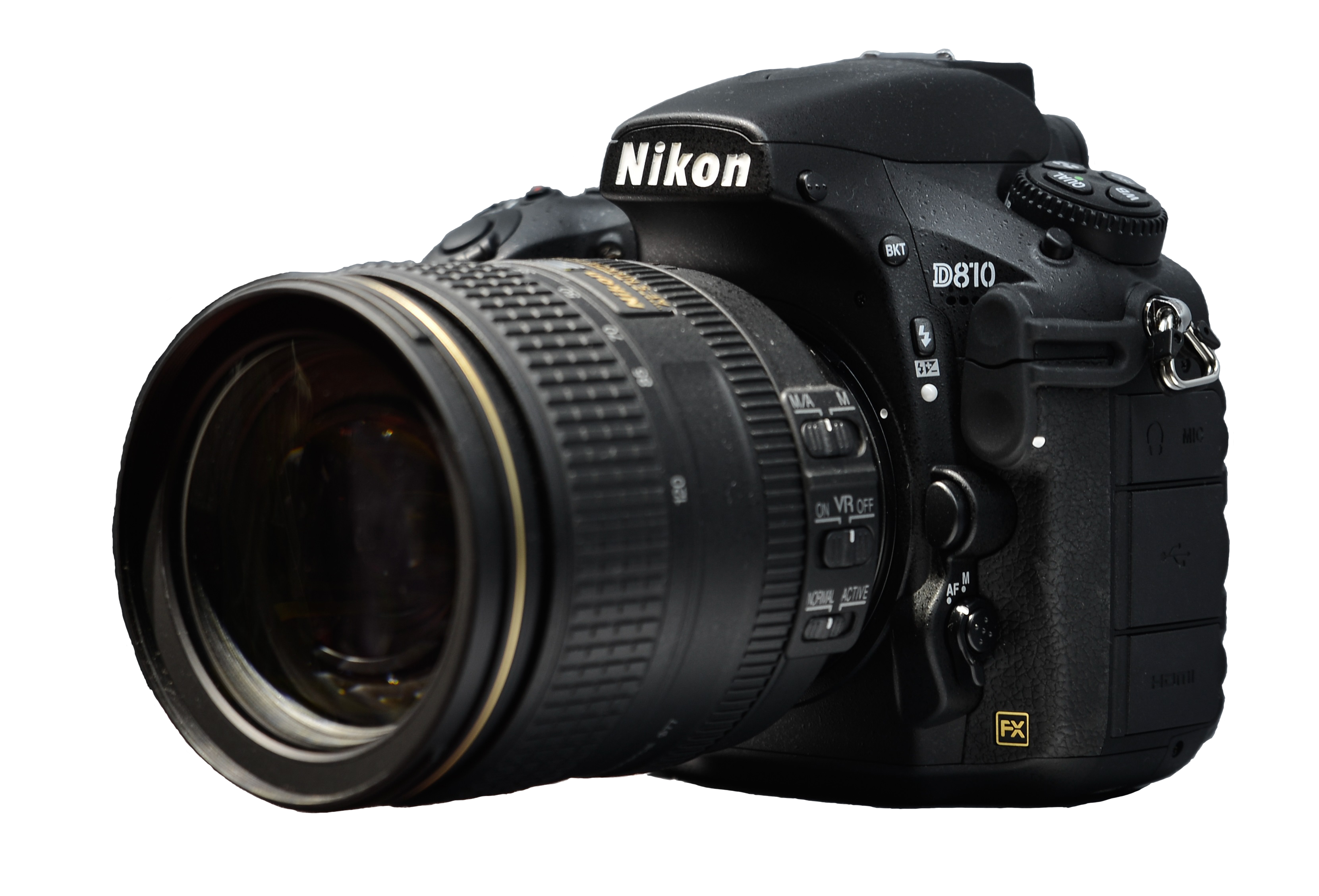

Overview
- Maker: Nikon
- Type: Digital single-lens reflex
- Released: 26 June 2014
- Intro price: $2900 (2014 price) $1200 (2019 price)

Lens
- Lens: Interchangeable, Nikon F-mount

Sensor/medium
- Sensor: 35.9×24 mm Full Frame FX format CMOS, 4.88 μm pixel size
- Maximum resolution: 7360 × 4912 pixels (36.3 megapixels)
- Film speed: 64–12,800, extended mode 32 to 51,200
- Storage media: CompactFlash (Type I, UDMA compliant) and Secure Digital (UHS-I compliant; SDHC, SDXC compatible and with Eye-Fi WLAN support)

Focusing
- Focus modes: Instant single-servo (AF-S); continuous-servo (AF-C); auto AF-S/AF-C selection (AF-A); manual (M)
- Focus areas: Multi-CAM 3500FX 51-point AF

Exposure/metering
- Exposure bracketing: 2 to 9 frames in 1/3, 1/2, 2/3, or 1 EV steps, up to 8 EV range. Or 2 to 5 frames in steps of 2 or 3 EV, up to 12 EV range
- Exposure modes: Programmed Auto [P], Shutter-Priority Auto [S], Aperture-Priority Auto [A], Manual [M]
- Exposure metering: TTL 3D Color Matrix Metering III with a 91,000-pixel RGB sensor
- Metering modes: Matrix, center-weighted, spot, highlight-weighted metering

Flash
- Flash: Integrated manual pop-up with button release Guide number 12/39 (ISO 100, m/ft)
- Flash bracketing: −3 to +3 EV in increments of 1/3, 1/2, 2/3, or 1 EV; 2 to 5 frames in steps of 2 or 3 EV

Shutter
- Shutter: Electronically controlled vertical-travel focal-plane shutter
- Shutter speed range: 1/8000 to 30 s, bulb, X-sync at 1/250 s.
- Continuous shooting: 5 frames per second; 6 per second in DX and 1.2× crop modes; 7 per second with battery grip in DX and 1.2× crop modes

Viewfinder
- Viewfinder: Optical pentaprism, 100% coverage, approx. 0.70× magnification

Image processing
- White balance: Flat, Landscape, Monochrome, Neutral, Portrait, Standard, Vivid, Custom: Picture Control 2.0
- WB bracketing: 2 to 9 frames in 1/3, 1/2, 2/3, or 1 EV steps
- Dynamic range bracketing: 2 frames using selected value for one frame or 3 to 5 frames using preset values for all frames
- Dynamic range compressor: Active D-Lighting: auto, extra high, high, normal, low or off

General
- LCD screen: 3.2 inch, 1229k-dot RGBW VGA resolution
- Battery: Nikon EN-EL15a/EN-EL15 rechargeable lithium-ion battery
- AV port: HDMI C (mini)
- Data port(s): USB 3.0, Nikon 10-Pin
- Dimensions: 146×123×81.5 mm (5.75×4.84×3.21 in)
- Weight: 880 g (31 oz), 980 g (35 oz) with battery
- Latest firmware: 1.14 / 12 June 2018; 8 years ago
- Made in: Thailand

Chronology
- Predecessor: D800/D800E
- Successor: Nikon D850

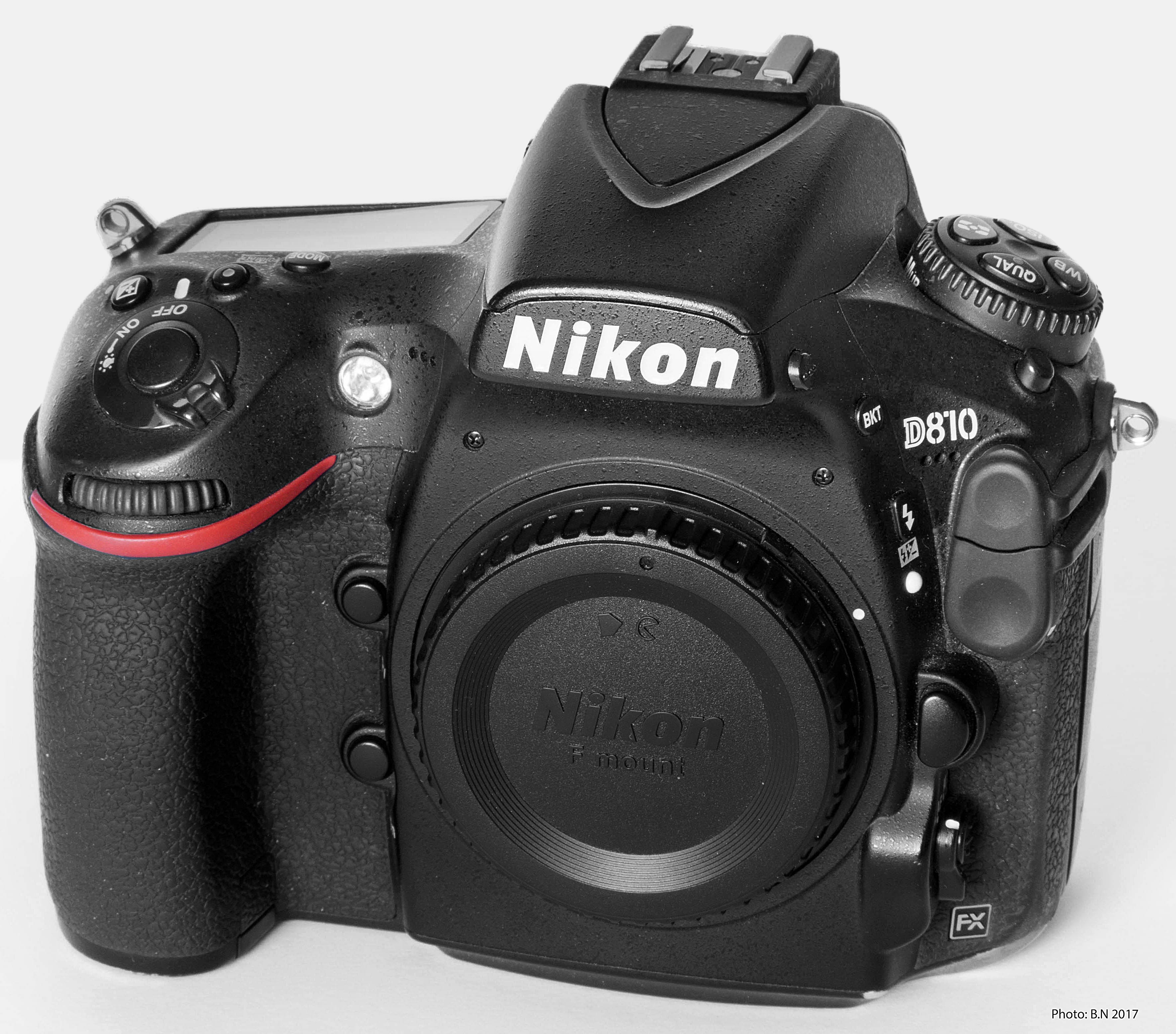
Nikon D810

The Nikon D810 is a 36.3-megapixel professional-grade full-frame digital single-lens reflex camera produced by Nikon. The camera was officially announced in June 2014, and became available in July 2014.

Compared to the former D800/D800E it offers an image sensor with a base sensitivity of ISO 64 and extended range of ISO 32 to 51,200, an Expeed processor with noise reduction with claimed 1 stop noise improvement, doubled buffer size, increased frame rate and extended battery life, improved autofocus – now similar to the D4S, improved video with 1080p 60 fps and many software improvements.

The D810 was succeeded by the Nikon D850 in August 2017 and was listed as discontinued in December 2019.

== Features ==
- New 37.09 megapixel (36.3 effective) full-frame (35.9×24 mm) sensor with sensitivity of ISO 64–12,800 (ISO 32–51,200 boost) and no optical low-pass filter (OLPF, anti-aliasing filter)
  - Improved microlenses with increased light gathering
- Nikon Expeed 4 image processor with improved noise reduction, moiré (aliasing) reduction and increased battery life to 1200 shots / 40 minutes video notwithstanding 30% higher speed
  - Roughly doubled buffer size of D800/D800E
  - Frame rate (photo) increased to 5 fps FX (full-frame, DX up to 7 fps). Videos up to 1080p 60p / 50p fps
  - Simultaneous video recording on external recorder (uncompressed video, clean HDMI; up to 1080p60) and compressed on memory card
- Autofocus equivalent to D4S, also Group Area mode: uses five AF sensors together. Face-detection switchable with custom settings
- Highlight-weighted metering preventing blown highlights or underexposed shadows. Also Highlight Display with Zebra Stripes and full aperture metering during live view and video
- Kevlar/carbon fiber composite shutter with reduced lag, vibrations and shutter noise. Redesigned Sequencer / Balancer Mechanism for Quiet and Quiet Continuous modes
  - Electronic front curtain shutter for further reduced vibrations enabling higher resolutions
- Timelapse up to 9,999 frames, additionally timelapse videos. Timelapse / Interval Timer Exposure Smoothing
- Customizable 'Picture Control 2.0' options: Flat affecting dynamic range (preserve highlights and shadows), Clarity affecting details. Other settings affecting exposure, white balance, sharpness, brightness, saturation, hue; allowing custom curves to be created, edited, saved, exported and imported
- 3.2" 1229k-dot (RGBW, four dots per pixel: extra white dot) VGA LCD with "Split-screen display zoom" function
- USB 3.0, HDMI C (mini), Nikon 10-Pin interfaces and 3.5 mm / 1/8″ stereo headphone + 3.5 mm / 1/8″ stereo microphone connectors
- "Superior" resistance to dust and water (Nikon claim)

== Accessories ==
- Nikon WT-4/WT-4A or WT-5/WT-5A (also UT-1 network) Wireless Transmitter for WLAN. Third-party solutions available.
- Nikon Wireless remote control or third-party solutions.
- Nikon GP-1 or GP-1A GPS Unit for direct GPS geotagging. Third-party solutions partly with three-axis compass, data-logger, bluetooth and support for indoor use are available from Solmeta, Dawn, Easytag, Foolography, Gisteq and Phottix. See comparisons/reviews.
- Nikon Battery grip or third-party solutions
- Various Nikon Speedlight or third-party flash units. Also working as commander for Nikon Creative Lighting System wireless (slave) flash.

Third-party radio (wireless) flash control triggers

- Tethered shooting with Nikon Camera Control Pro 2, third-party solutions or open-source software and apps
- Other accessories from Nikon and third parties, including protective cases and bags, eyepiece adapters and correction lenses, and underwater housings.
- Nikon D810 animator's kit including the AF-S VR Micro-NIKKOR 105mm f/2.8G, Dragonframe 3.5 software, power supply and cables
- Nikon D810 DSLR Filmmaker's Kit including three fast prime lenses, a portable HDMI recorder using "Pro" codecs, but not capable for storing uncompressed video, ME-1 Stereo Microphone, filters, batteries and cables

== Reception ==
External media

Images
- Nikon D810 sample, review and user images, >20MPix. Google Image search
- Nikon D810 images >22MPix at Flickr

Video
- Nikon D810 sample, review and user videos

At the time of its release, the Nikon D810 became the Dxomark image sensor leader ahead of the Nikon D800E and received many reviews.

== Service advisory ==
On August 19, 2014, Nikon acknowledged a problem reported by some users, of bright spots appearing in long-exposure photographs, as well as "in some images captured at an Image area setting of 1.2× (30×20)." Existing owners of D810 cameras were asked to visit a website to determine whether their camera could be affected, on the basis of serial numbers. Repairs would be made by Nikon free of charge. If bright spots still appear in images after servicing, Nikon recommends enabling Long exposure NR. Products already serviced have a black dot inside the tripod socket.

== Nikon D810A ==
An astrophotography variant with a special infrared filter capable of deep red / near infrared and with special software tweaks like long-exposure modes up to 15 minutes, virtual horizon indicator and a special Astro Noise Reduction software was announced February 10, 2015. The D810A's IR filter is optimized for H-alpha (Hα) red tones, resulting in four times greater sensitivity to the 656 nm wavelength than the D810. In comparison, Canon's astrophotography DSLRs 20Da and 60Da Hα sensitivity was 2.5 times and 3 times (respectively) more than the standard 20D / 60D. The D810A additionally has 1.39 stops advantage due to the larger image sensor format – resulting in better than 2 stops sensitivity advantage giving over four times faster exposure times compared to the Canon 20Da/60Da.

External media

Images
- Nikon D810A sample, review and user images, >20MPix. Google Image search
- Nikon D810A images >22MPix at Flickr

Video
- Nikon D810A sample, review and user videos

Although the D810A can be used for normal photography, due to the deep red / near infrared sensitivity the in-camera white balance may fail in case of fluorescent light or difficult cases with very strong infrared light – requiring an external infrared filter. Nikon published an D810A astrophotography guide that recommends live view focusing with 23× enlarged selected areas and a gallery showing the mostly small effects to the color reproduction in "normal" photos.

A review concludes that especially the D810A long exposure noise is superior compared to the D800E and other Nikon fullframes, and shows effects of the increased H-alpha sensitivity. Color balance of "normal" photos seems mostly correct, except comparatively hotter objects with strong infrared radiation and a bit more purple in sunsets.

Sensor	Class	1999	2000	2001	2002	2003	2004	2005	2006	2007	2008	2009	2010	2011	2012	2013	2014	2015	2016	2017	2018	2019	2020	2021	2022	2023	2024	2025	2026
FX (Full-frame)	Flagship											D3X ^{−P}																	
FX (Full-frame)	Flagship										D3 ^{−P}		D3S ^{−P}		D4		D4S		D5^{T}					D6^{T}					
FX (Full-frame)	Professional											D700 ^{−P}			D800/D800E			D810/D810A			D850 ^{AT}								
FX (Full-frame)	Enthusiast																Df												
FX (Full-frame)	Enthusiast																	D750 ^{A}					D780 ^{AT}						
FX (Full-frame)	Enthusiast															D600	D610												
DX (APS-C)	Flagship		D1^{−E}	D1X^{−E}				D2X^{−E}		D2Xs^{−E}																			
DX (APS-C)	Flagship		D1^{−E}	D1H ^{−E}			D2H^{−E}	D2Hs^{−E}																					
DX (APS-C)	Professional				D100^{−E}				D200^{−E}		D300^{−P}		D300S^{−P}						D500 ^{AT}										
DX (APS-C)	Enthusiast						D70^{−E}		D70s^{−E}	D80^{−E}		D90^{−E}		D7000 ^{−P}			D7100	D7200			D7500 ^{AT}								
DX (APS-C)	Upper-entry								D50^{−E}	D40X^{−E*}	D60^{−E*}		D5000^{A−P*}		D5100^{A−P*}	D5200^{A−P*}	D5300^{A*}	D5500^{AT*}		D5600 ^{AT*}									
DX (APS-C)	Entry-level									D40^{−E*}			D3000^{−E*}	D3100^{−P*}		D3200^{−P*}	D3300^{*}			D3400^{*}		D3500^{*}							
Early models		SVC (prototype; 1986); QV-1000C (1988); NASA F4 (1991); E2/E2S (1995); E2N/E2NS (1996); E3/E3S (1998)																											
Sensor	Class																												
Sensor	Class	1999	2000	2001	2002	2003	2004	2005	2006	2007	2008	2009	2010	2011	2012	2013	2014	2015	2016	2017	2018	2019	2020	2021	2022	2023	2024	2025	2026
