= Nikon D800 =

Digital single-lens reflex camera

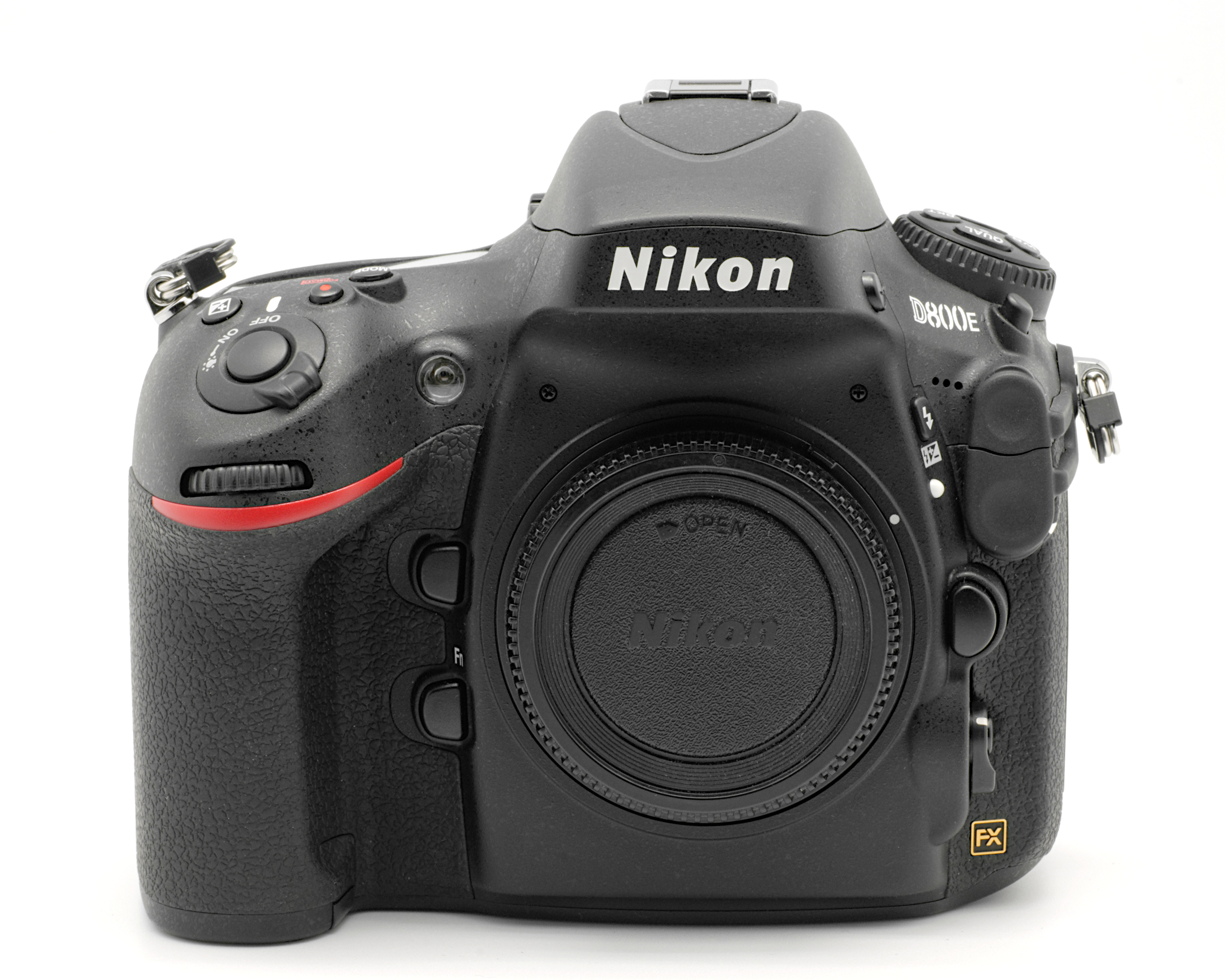

Overview
- Maker: Nikon Corporation
- Type: Digital single-lens reflex
- Released: 6 February 2012

Lens
- Lens: Interchangeable, Nikon F-mount

Sensor/medium
- Sensor: 35.9 × 24 mm Full Frame FX format CMOS, 4.88 μm pixel size
- Maximum resolution: 7,360 × 4,912 (36.3 effective megapixels)
- Film speed: 100–6400, extended mode to 50–12800, HI2 mode 25600
- Recording medium: CompactFlash (Type I, UDMA compliant) and Secure Digital (UHS-I compliant; SDHC, SDXC compatible and with Eye-Fi WLAN support)

Focusing
- Focus modes: Instant single-servo (AF-S); continuous-servo (AF-C); auto AF-S/AF-C selection (AF-A); manual (M)
- Focus areas: Multi-CAM 3500FX 51-point AF

Exposure/metering
- Exposure metering: TTL 3D Color Matrix Metering III with a 91,000-pixel RGB sensor
- Metering modes: Matrix metering, center-weighted metering, spot metering

Flash
- Flash: Manual pop-up with button release Guide number 12/39 (ISO 100, m/ft)
- Flash bracketing: -3 to +3 EV in increments of 1/3, 1/2, 2/3, or 1 EV

Shutter
- Shutter: Electronically controlled vertical-travel focal-plane shutter
- Shutter speed range: 1/8000 to 30 s, bulb, X-sync at 1/250 s.
- Continuous shooting: 4 frames per second; 5 per second in DX and 1.2× crop modes; 6 per second with battery grip in DX and 1.2× crop modes

Viewfinder
- Viewfinder: Optical pentaprism, 100% coverage, approx. 0.70× magnification

General
- LCD screen: 3.2 inch, VGA resolution (921,600 pixels)
- Battery: Nikon EN-EL15 rechargeable lithium-ion battery
- Dimensions: 146×123×81.5 mm (5.75×4.84×3.21 in)
- Weight: 900 g (32 oz), body only
- Made in: Japan

Chronology
- Successor: Nikon D810

The Nikon D800 is a 36.3-megapixel professional-grade full-frame digital single-lens reflex camera produced by Nikon Corporation. It was given a Gold Award by Digital Photography Review.

It was officially announced on February 7, 2012, and went on sale in late March 2012 for the suggested retail price of $2999.95 in the U.S., £2399 in the UK, and €2892 in the Eurozone. Shortly after the camera went on sale, Nikon's UK subsidiary increased the price of the D800 in that market by £200 to £2599, saying that the original price was due to an "internal systems error". However, Nikon honored the original price for all pre-orders placed before March 24, and added that no price changes would be made in other markets.

The successor is the Nikon D810 – announced June 26, 2014.

== Features ==
- 36.8 (36.3 effective) megapixel full-frame (35.9 mm × 24 mm) sensor with ISO 100–6400 (ISO 50–25600 boost)
- Nikon Expeed 3 image processor
- 91,000 pixel RGB metering sensor with Advanced Scene Recognition System
- Advanced Multi-CAM3500FX autofocus sensor (51-point, 15 cross-type, 11 points sensitive at maximum apertures as small as f/8)
- H.264/MPEG-4 AVC Expeed video processor. 1080p Full HD movie mode at 24/25/30 fps, 720p at 24/25/30/50/60 fps, HDMI HD video out with support of uncompressed video output, stereo monitor headphone out, and stereo input (3.5-mm diameter) with manual sound level control.
- 4 frames per second in continuous FX mode or 5:4 crop mode. 5 frames per second in continuous 1.2× crop mode or DX (APS-C) mode. With the optional MB-D12 battery grip, fitted with either the EN-EL18 battery pack of the D4 or AA batteries, continuous shooting at 6 frames per second in DX mode is supported.
- Buffer size for 17 RAW or 56 JPEG with maximum quality.
- Built-in High dynamic range imaging (HDR) mode (2 frames up to 3EV apart)
- 'Active D-Lighting' with 6 settings and bracketing (adjusts metering and D-Lighting curve)
- Customizable 'Picture Control' settings affecting exposure, white balance, sharpness, brightness, saturation, hue; allowing custom curves to be created, edited, saved, exported and imported
- Pop-up flash that doubles as a wireless flash controller
- USB 3.0 connectivity
- Image sensor cleaning
- Shutter rated at 200,000 actuations
- Live View with either phase detect or improved contrast detect Auto Focus
- Dual card slots, one CompactFlash UDMA and one SD, SDHC, SDXC, UHS-I and Eye-Fi (WLAN) compatible card slot (mirror, overflow, back-up, RAW on 1/JPEG on 2, Stills on 1/Movies on 2, copy)
- Magnesium alloy weather-sealed body comparable to D700, but considered less robust than D4
- GPS interface for direct geotagging supported by Nikon GP-1

== Image quality ==
At the time of its release, the Nikon D800 became the Dxomark image sensor leader, replacing the Nikon D4 in the top position.

== D800E ==
The D800E is a specialized version which uses a new optical anti-aliasing filter with no low-pass filter effect (no blurring) to obtain the sharpest images possible. Nikon claims that possible aliasing effects (moiré) can be lessened by software-processing in camera or external programs like Nikon's Capture NX2.

Reviewers have pointed out that although increased moiré is difficult to remove in post-processing, it is relatively easy to combat while photo-taking (such as by changing the angle, aperture or position). Furthermore, moiré is rarely found in photos (besides man-made, repeated patterns such as in architecture or textiles). The lack of low-pass filter brings about a small improvement in optical resolution in the 800E, especially in portraits with larger apertures, where diffraction is not an issue. Even minimal diffraction negates the advantage of the 800E.

=== Mislabelled D800 as D800E fraud ===
Nikon has advised that there are mislabelled Nikon D800E in circulation that are actually the D800 model with the front cover replaced so as to appear like a D800E. A D800 modified to appear to be a D800E is not covered under Nikon warranty. Nikon advises users to "please take all necessary precautions to ensure the authenticity of a camera before purchasing one".

To detect fake models the user has to display an image captured with the camera in the camera's monitor. The name of the camera used to capture the image will be displayed at the top right corner of the display when the overview display option is enabled in full-frame playback mode. If the correct model number is displayed, it is authentic.

Sensor	Class	1999	2000	2001	2002	2003	2004	2005	2006	2007	2008	2009	2010	2011	2012	2013	2014	2015	2016	2017	2018	2019	2020	2021	2022	2023	2024	2025	2026
FX (Full-frame)	Flagship											D3X ^{−P}																	
FX (Full-frame)	Flagship										D3 ^{−P}		D3S ^{−P}		D4		D4S		D5^{T}					D6^{T}					
FX (Full-frame)	Professional											D700 ^{−P}			D800/D800E			D810/D810A			D850 ^{AT}								
FX (Full-frame)	Enthusiast																Df												
FX (Full-frame)	Enthusiast																	D750 ^{A}					D780 ^{AT}						
FX (Full-frame)	Enthusiast															D600	D610												
DX (APS-C)	Flagship		D1^{−E}	D1X^{−E}				D2X^{−E}		D2Xs^{−E}																			
DX (APS-C)	Flagship		D1^{−E}	D1H ^{−E}			D2H^{−E}	D2Hs^{−E}																					
DX (APS-C)	Professional				D100^{−E}				D200^{−E}		D300^{−P}		D300S^{−P}						D500 ^{AT}										
DX (APS-C)	Enthusiast						D70^{−E}		D70s^{−E}	D80^{−E}		D90^{−E}		D7000 ^{−P}			D7100	D7200			D7500 ^{AT}								
DX (APS-C)	Upper-entry								D50^{−E}	D40X^{−E*}	D60^{−E*}		D5000^{A−P*}		D5100^{A−P*}	D5200^{A−P*}	D5300^{A*}	D5500^{AT*}		D5600 ^{AT*}									
DX (APS-C)	Entry-level									D40^{−E*}			D3000^{−E*}	D3100^{−P*}		D3200^{−P*}	D3300^{*}			D3400^{*}		D3500^{*}							
Early models		SVC (prototype; 1986); QV-1000C (1988); NASA F4 (1991); E2/E2S (1995); E2N/E2NS (1996); E3/E3S (1998)																											
Sensor	Class																												
Sensor	Class	1999	2000	2001	2002	2003	2004	2005	2006	2007	2008	2009	2010	2011	2012	2013	2014	2015	2016	2017	2018	2019	2020	2021	2022	2023	2024	2025	2026
