= Motion diagram =

Diagram used in physics to represent the motion of an object

A motion diagram represents the motion of an object by displaying its location at various equally spaced times on the same diagram. Motion diagrams are a pictorial description of an object's motion. They show an object's position and velocity initially, and present several spots in the center of the diagram. These spots reveal whether or not the object has accelerated or decelerated.

For simplicity, the object is represented by a simple shape, such as a filled circle. It contains information about object positions at particular time instances. Therefore, a motion diagram is more informative than a path.

== Viewing motion diagrams ==
One of the major usages of motion diagrams is to present film through a series of frames taken by a camera. Viewing an object on a motion diagram allows one to determine if an object is at a constant rest, speeding up, or slowing down. As the frames are taken, it can be assumed that an object is at a constant rest if it occupies the same position over time. It can be assumed that an object is speeding up if there is a visible increase in the space between objects as time passes. An object can be assumed to be slowing down if there is a visible decrease in the space between objects as time passes. The objects on the frame come very close together.
