= Nikon Z8 =

2023 full-frame mirrorless camera

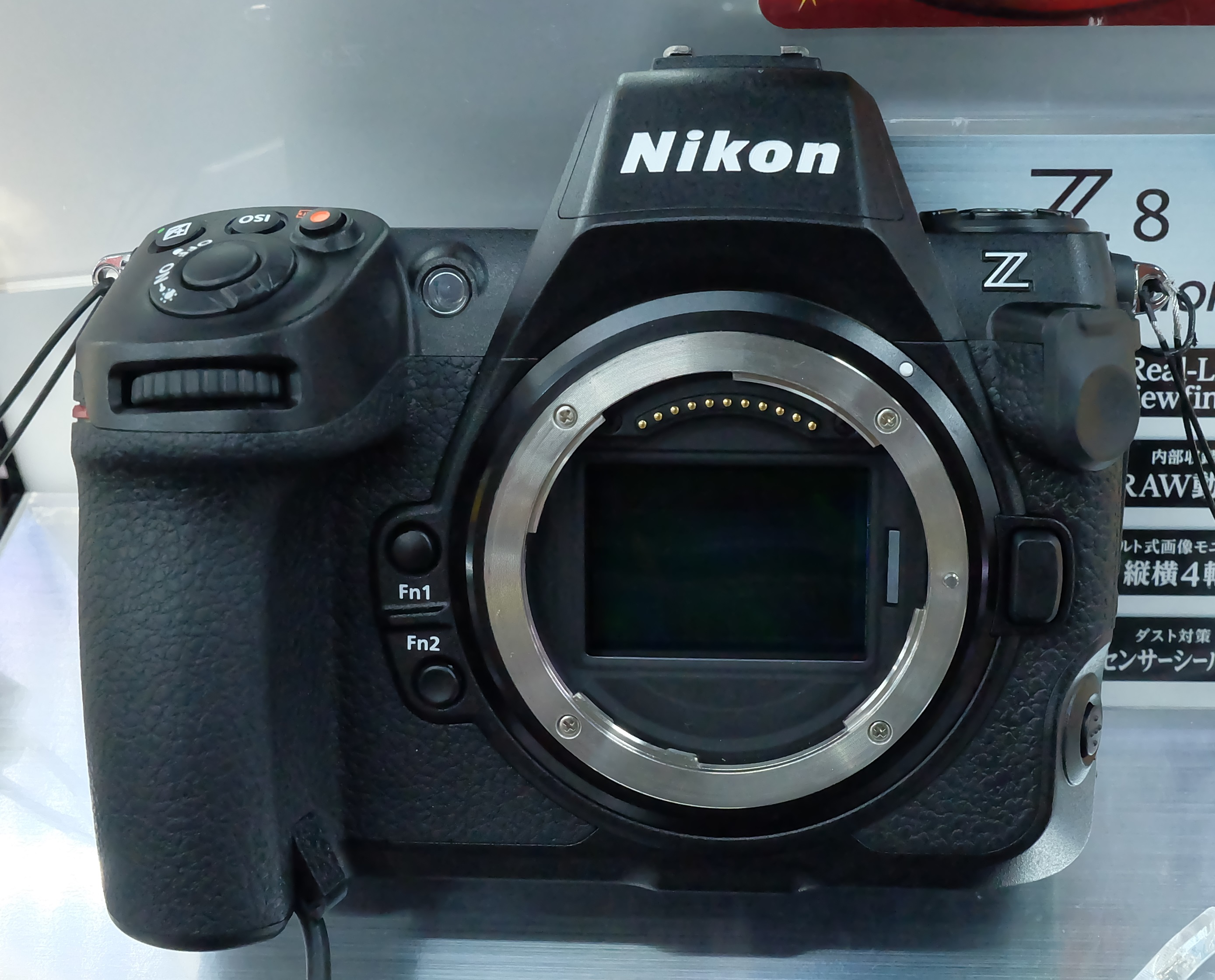

Overview
- Maker: Nikon
- Type: Full-frame mirrorless interchangeable-lens camera
- Released: 26 May 2023; 3 years ago
- Intro price: JPY 599,500 (body only); USD 3,999.95

Lens
- Lens mount: Nikon Z-mount

Sensor/medium
- Sensor type: Stacked back-illuminated CMOS sensor
- Sensor size: Full frame (35.9 x 23.9 mm); Nikon FX format
- Sensor maker: Sony Semiconductor Manufacturing Corporation
- Maximum resolution: 8,256 x 5,504 (45.4 megapixels)
- Film speed: Native range of ISO 64-25,600 (expandable to 32-102,400)
- Recording medium: 1 × CFexpress Type B / XQD, 1 × SD (UHS-II)

Focusing
- Focus: Single-servo AF (AF-S); Continuous-servo AF (AF-C); Full-time AF (AF-F; only available in video mode); Predictive focus tracking Manual focus
- Focus areas: 493 points (single-point AF) with 90% coverage
- Focus bracketing: 2-300 frames, step width

Exposure/metering
- Exposure: TTL metering using camera image sensor
- Exposure modes: Programmed Auto [P] with flexible program; Shutter-Priority Auto [S]; Aperture-Priority Auto [A]; Manual [M]
- Exposure metering: TTL metering using camera image sensor Highlight-weighted metering: -3 to +17 EV (ISO 100, f/2.0 lens, 20 °C/68 °F)
- Metering modes: Matrix metering Center-weighted metering Spot metering Highlight-weighted metering

Flash
- Flash: Built-in: No; Hot shoe
- Flash synchronization: 1/200s (up to 1/8000s using high-speed sync)
- Flash bracketing: 3 or 5 frames up to 3 EV in 1/3 or 1/2 steps

Shutter
- Frame rate: Up to 120 fps in 11 MP continuous (C120), up to 60 fps in 19MP continuous (C60), up to 30 fps at full-resolution with JPEG output (C30), up to 20 fps with RAW output
- Shutter: Electronic shutter
- Shutter speeds: 900s – 1/32000s
- Continuous shooting: 20fps / 30 fps / 120fps (expand)

Viewfinder
- Viewfinder: Quad-VGA (1280x960) EVF (3690000 dots), 0.8x magnification with 50 mm lens, 3000 nits brightness

Image processing
- Image processor: Expeed 7
- White balance: Auto (3 variants); natural light auto; direct sunlight; cloudy; shade; incandescent; fluorescent (3 variants); flash; manual white point (2500‑10000 K); preset manual (6 variants)
- WB bracketing: 3 or 5 frames up to 3 EV in 1/3 or 1/2 steps

General
- Video recording: 8.3K up to 60 fps in 12-bit N-RAW, 8K up to 30 fps with N-log, 4.1K up to 60 fps in 12-bit ProRes RAW HQ, 4K up to 120 fps, 1080p up to 120 fps
- LCD screen: 3.2-inch vertically and horizontally tilting TFT LCD with 2.1 million dots with touchscreen
- Battery: EN-EL15c (backwards compatible with EN-EL15a/b batteries); USB-PD rechargeable
- Optional accessories: MB-N12 battery grip MC-N10 remote grip
- AV port(s): Dual USB Type-C, HDMI 2.1 Type-A, 3.5 mm microphone jack, 3.5 mm headphone jack
- Data port(s): IEEE 802.11b/g/n/a/ac/Wi-Fi, Bluetooth Low Energy
- Body features: In-Body Image Stabilization
- Dimensions: 144×118.5×83 mm (5.67×4.67×3.27 in)
- Weight: 910 g (32 oz) (with battery)
- Latest firmware: 3.12 / 20 October 2026; 18 days ago
- Made in: Thailand

Chronology
- Predecessor: Nikon D850

The Nikon Z8 is a high-end full-frame mirrorless camera produced by Nikon. The camera was announced on May 10, 2023. It is the tenth Z-mount camera body and the seventh full-frame Z-mount body.

== Image sensor and processor ==
The Z8 has the same 45.7 MP stacked CMOS sensor as the Z9, with identical autofocus and video capabilities. It includes built-in sensor cleaning and IBIS. It also uses the EXPEED 7 image processor.

== Lenses ==
The Z8 uses the Nikon Z-mount, developed by Nikon for its mirrorless digital cameras.

Nikon F-mount lenses can be used, with various degrees of compatibility, via the Nikon FTZ (F-to-Z) and FTZ II mount adapters.

== Features ==
The Z8 has around a 30% smaller body than the Z9, comparable to that of the D850, and approximately 100 grams lighter. The Z8's 493 point autofocus (AF) system is highly effective in recognizing and focusing on a variety of subjects, including faces, animals, birds, vehicles, and moving objects, such as aircraft. The eye-detection AF ensures sharp focus on human eyes, which is particularly beneficial for portrait photography. The autofocus is a hybrid phase-detection/contrast AF with AF assist.

The camera utilizes an electronic shutter with speeds up to 1/32000 sec and includes 5-axis in-body image stabilization.

HEIF was added as a recording format. The magnesium alloy and a new material developed by Teijin give it the same dust and water resistance as the D850. Firmware version 2.0 introduced Auto Capture (automatic triggering by motion, distance and subject detection), Pixel Shift (to create images up to 180 MP, NX Studio required for merging) and subject-detection for birds.

== Battery ==
The Z8 uses the Nikon EN-EL15a/b/c lithium-ion battery.

== Update history ==
Version	Release date	Notes
1.00	2023-05-26	Initial firmware version
1.01	2023-08-23	Changed high temperature warning thresholds; Fixed battery drain when off in some circumstances; Fixed disabled focus ring not being disabled in some circumstances
2.0	2024-02-06	Added pixel shift feature; Added new picture controls for stills and video; Added dedicated bird subject detection for stills and video; Increased maximum EVF/live view zoom from 200% to 400% for stills and video; Added Auto Capture feature for stills and also video (as in the Nikon Z9); Maximum pre-capture duration has been increased from 30s to 300s; New exposure bracketing settings; Added pulled low-ISO settings for recording N-log; Added slow-motion video recording; Various playback improvements; Various controls improvements; Various minor changes
2.01	2024-04-23	Fixed a green color cast appearing in some pictures; Fixed issue applying date/time; Fixed scrolling in image review with sub-selector; Fixed issue with EVF eye presence sensor not working properly after an update; Fixed issue with the i-menu not going away in some circumstances
2.10	2025-02-26	Added shutter angle mode instead of using shutter speeds; Added Power/Hi-Res Zoom Collab (only available with Nikkor Z 28-135mm f/4 PZ, as of February 2025); Added customizable zebra pattern colors; Transparency, size and position of the histogram and wave-form monitor can now be changed; Hi-Res Zoom is now available even when using DX sensor area; Added Saving and loading power zoom positions; Added various settings for controlling and customizing the behavior of power zoom (only available with Nikkor Z 28-135mm f/4 PZ, as of February 2025); Shooting modes now can be selected in photo and video mode individually; Fixed issue where battery capacity dropped with some CFexpress cards; Fixed various issues that occurred after burst photography, with flicker reduction enabled; Fixed issue with auto capture not engaging in some cases
3.00	2025-07-01	The C15 high-speed frame capture mode was added; An in-body focus limiter (setting item a16) with exact distances for the nearest and farthest limits of focus range was added; When shooting N-Log, Video view assist for more consistent exposure was added; When shooting in high-speed frame capture modes (HSFC: C15, C30, C60, C120), a dedicated image quality can now be set; Flexible color picture controls were added; For selecting a noise reduction processing mode and allowing frequency presets to be configured, respectively, options High ISO NR mode and High-frequency flicker reduction were added; Item a14 (for Maximum aperture live view) was added to force the aperture of the lens to be set to its maximum when in Live view, regardless of the aperture setting; Pixel-shift can now be used together with Auto Exposure Bracketing and Focus Shift Shooting; The Auto Capture feature for stills and video was enhanced; Autofocus was enhance allowing for Subject detection with manual focus lenses (with eye/face detection); Wide-area C1 and C2 focus areas can now be defined much closer to the edge of frame; Network functionality was added (STA Wi-Fi connection mode, customizable Port numbers and support for uploading HEIF to an FTP server); Improvements to some Controls and assignable functions; An external microphone can now be used for Voice memos; NX Field support was added
3.01	2025-07-16	Corrected an issue introduced in FW 3.00 that prevented the camera from properly operating with some third-party lenses AF
3.10	2025-09-17	Fixed bugs; Some "Filtered playback criteria" items that were checked were deselected after the camera was turned off and back on; After the standby timer had expired and restarted, when powered by USB, focus position was not saved when selected; When recording ended, uninterrupted video output to HDMI monitors specs were changed.

== Marketing slogan ==
When the Z8 was launched, Nikon used a marketing slogan: “READY. ACTION.”

== Gallery ==
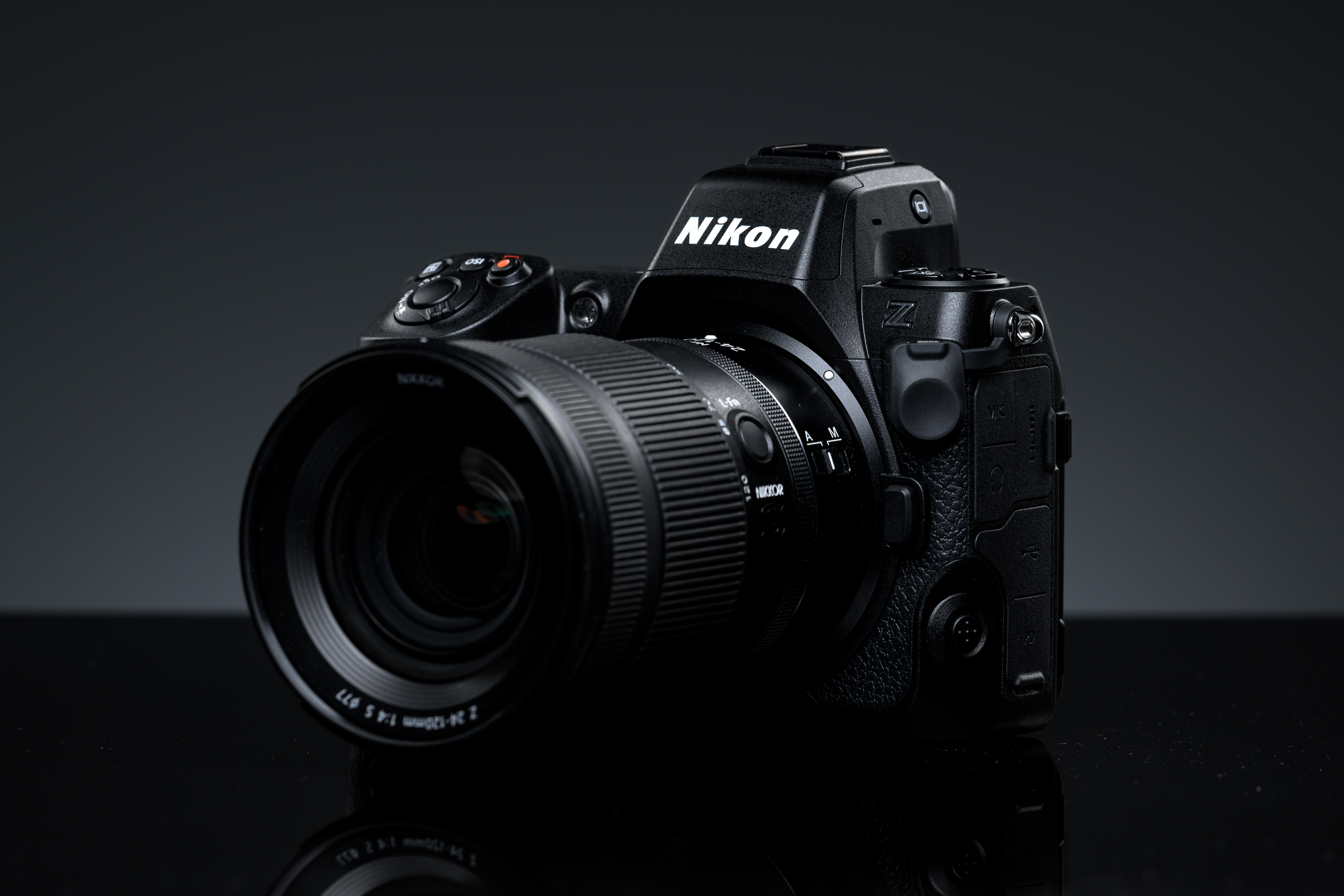

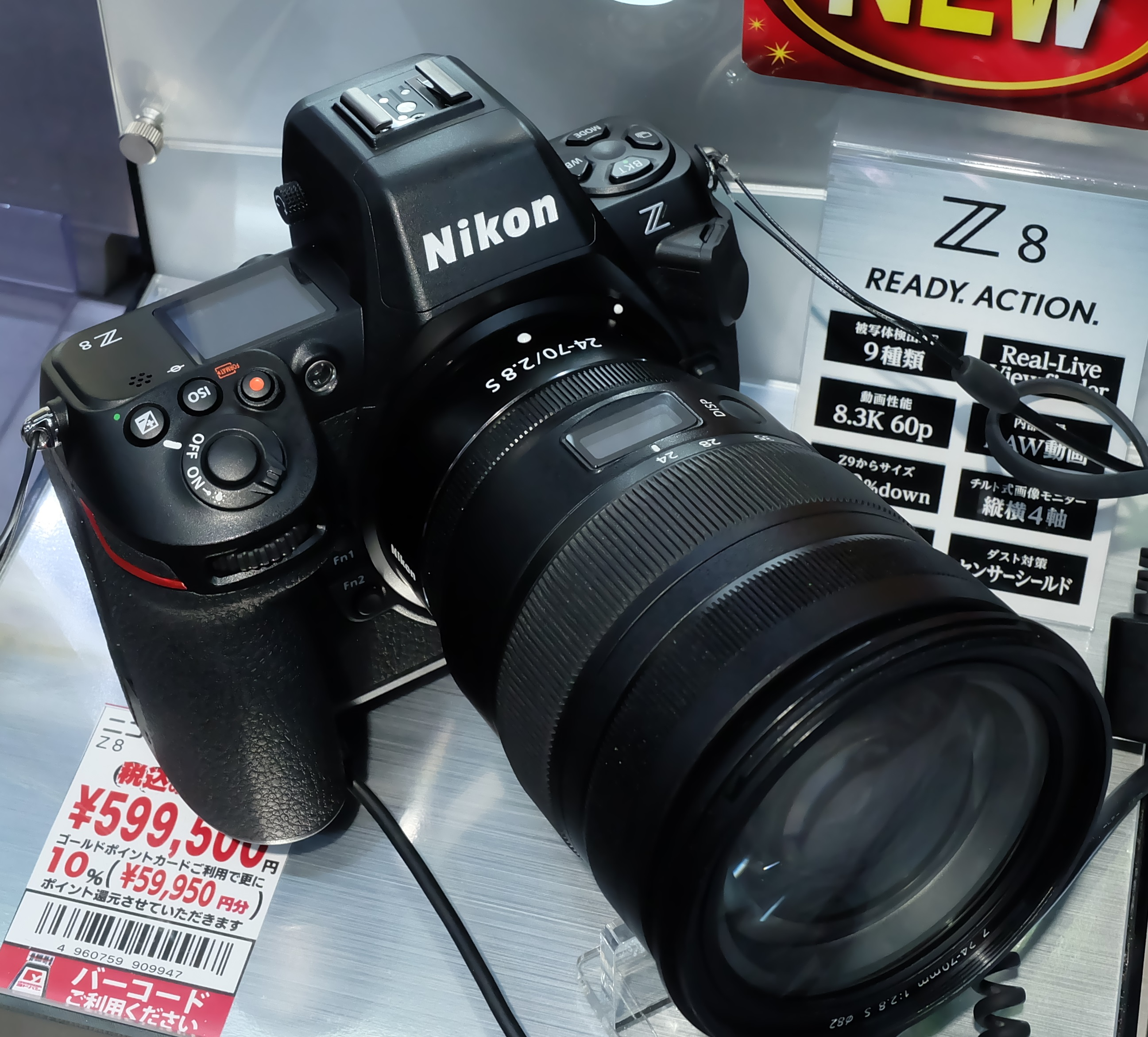

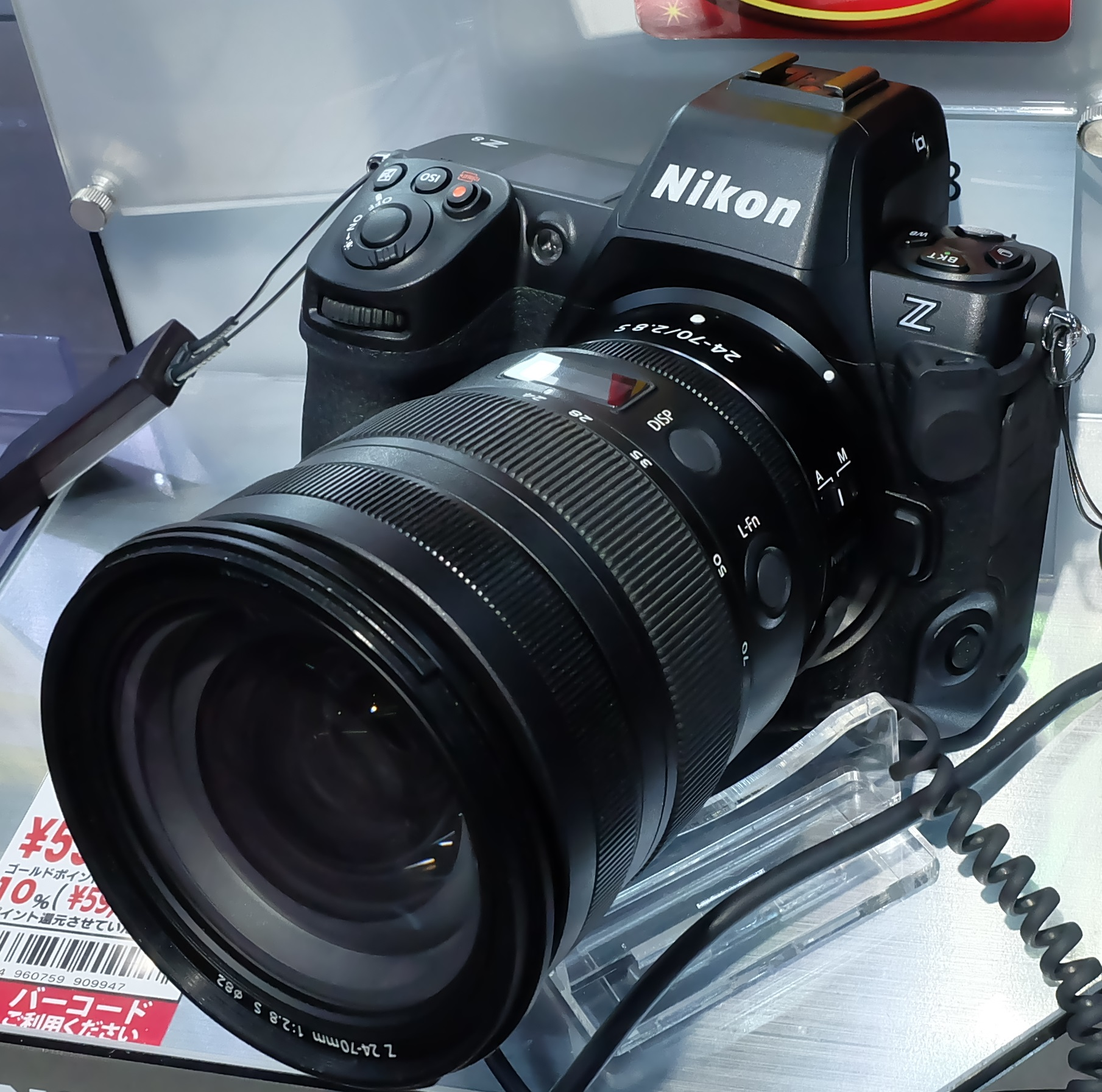

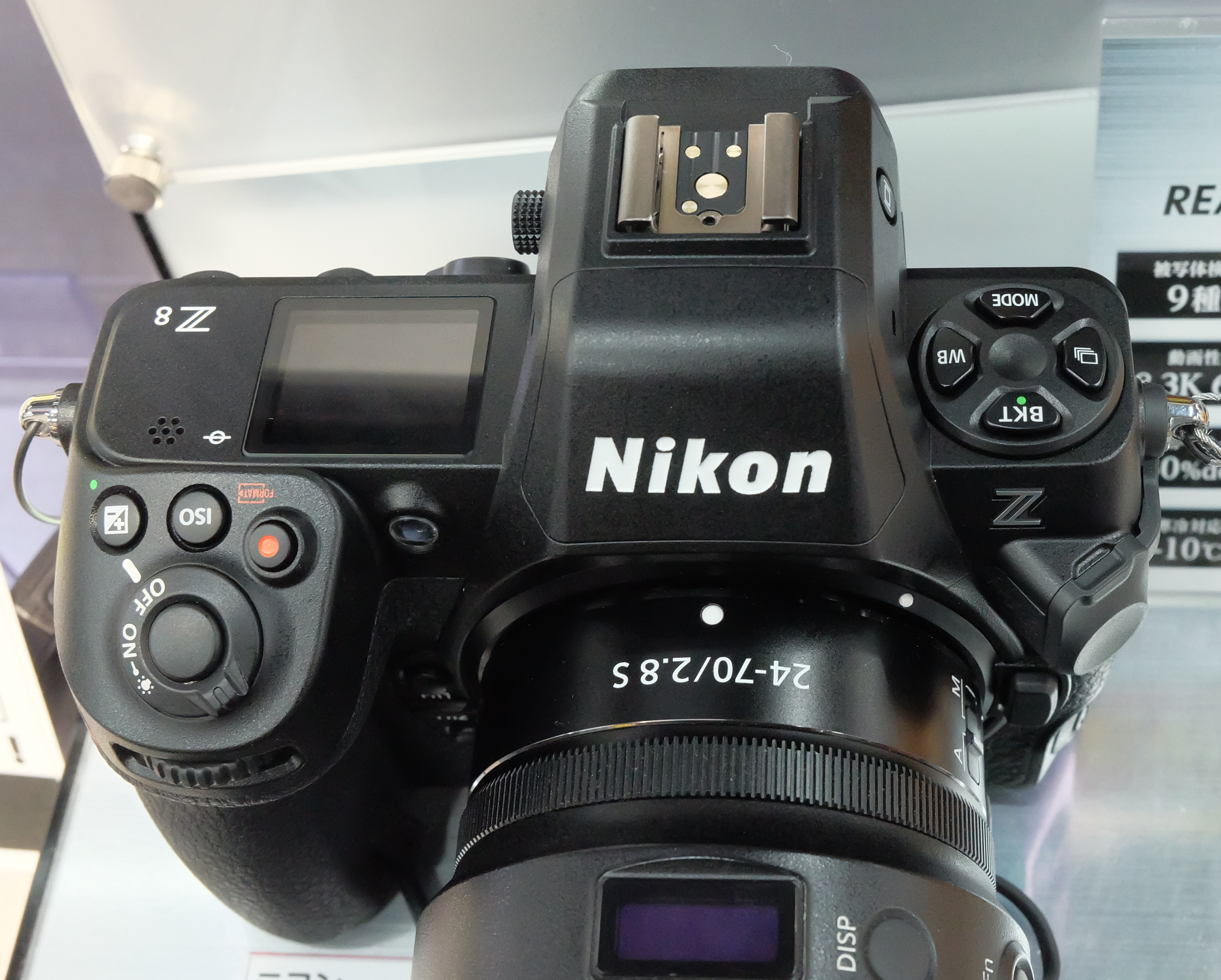

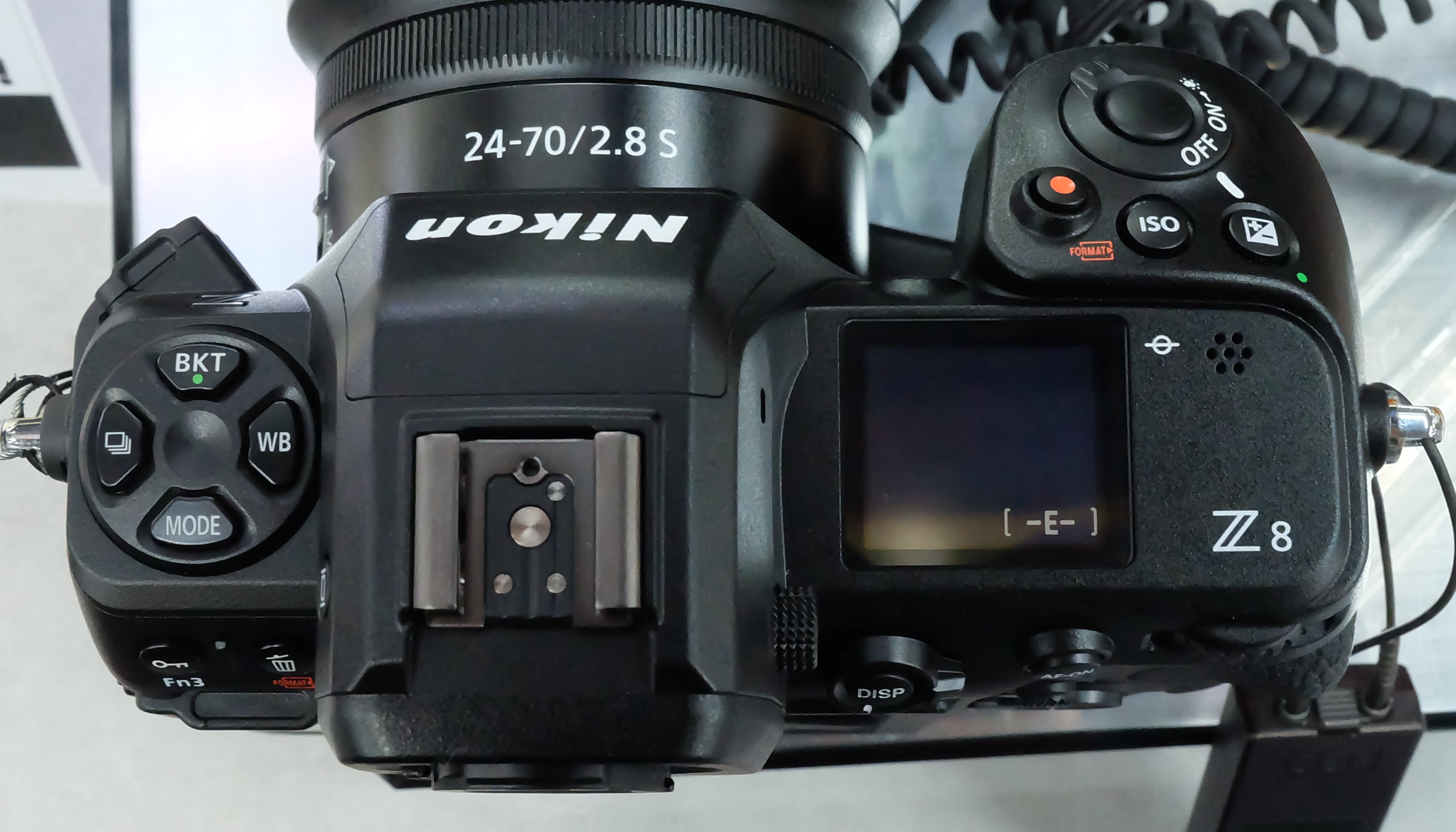

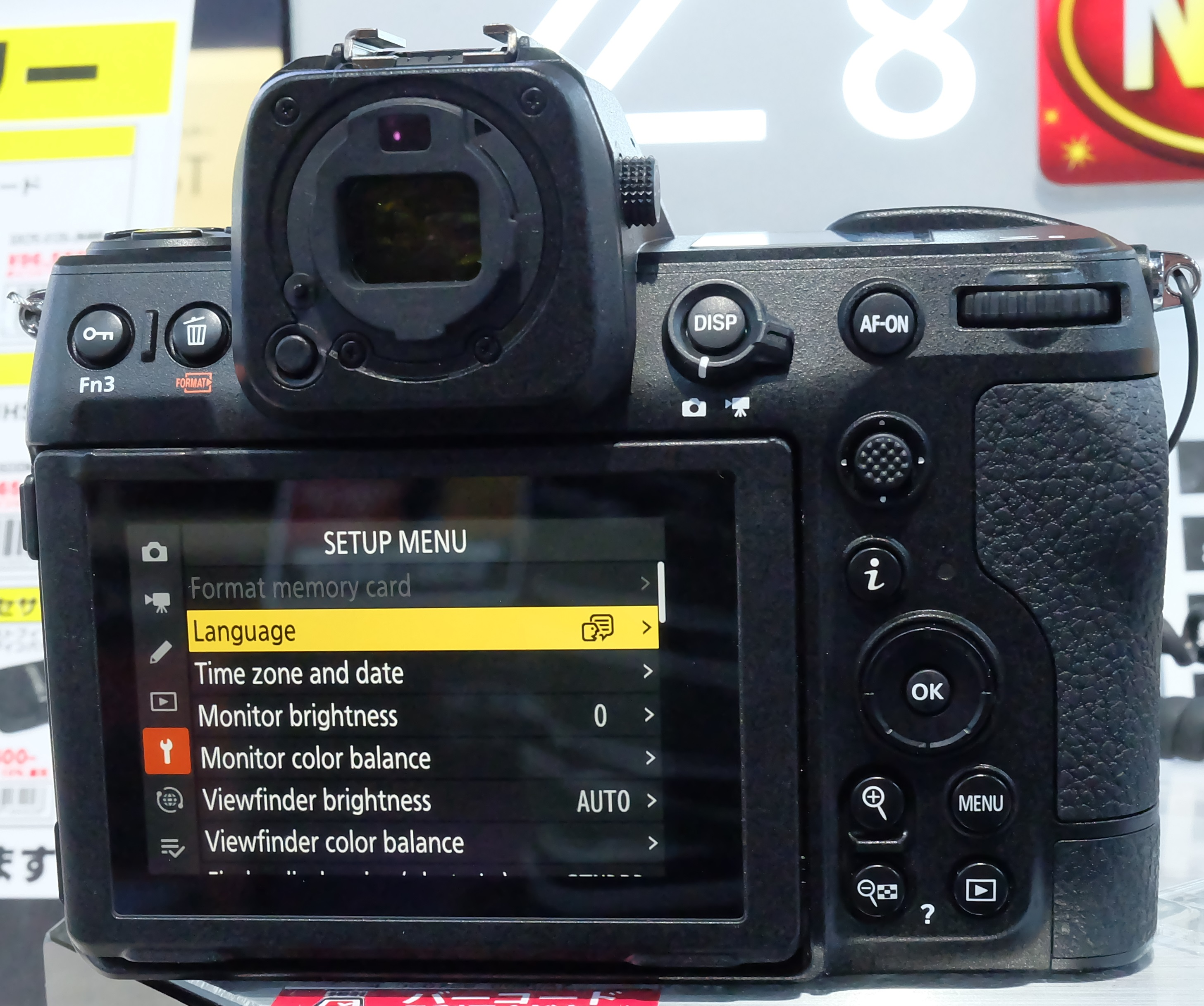

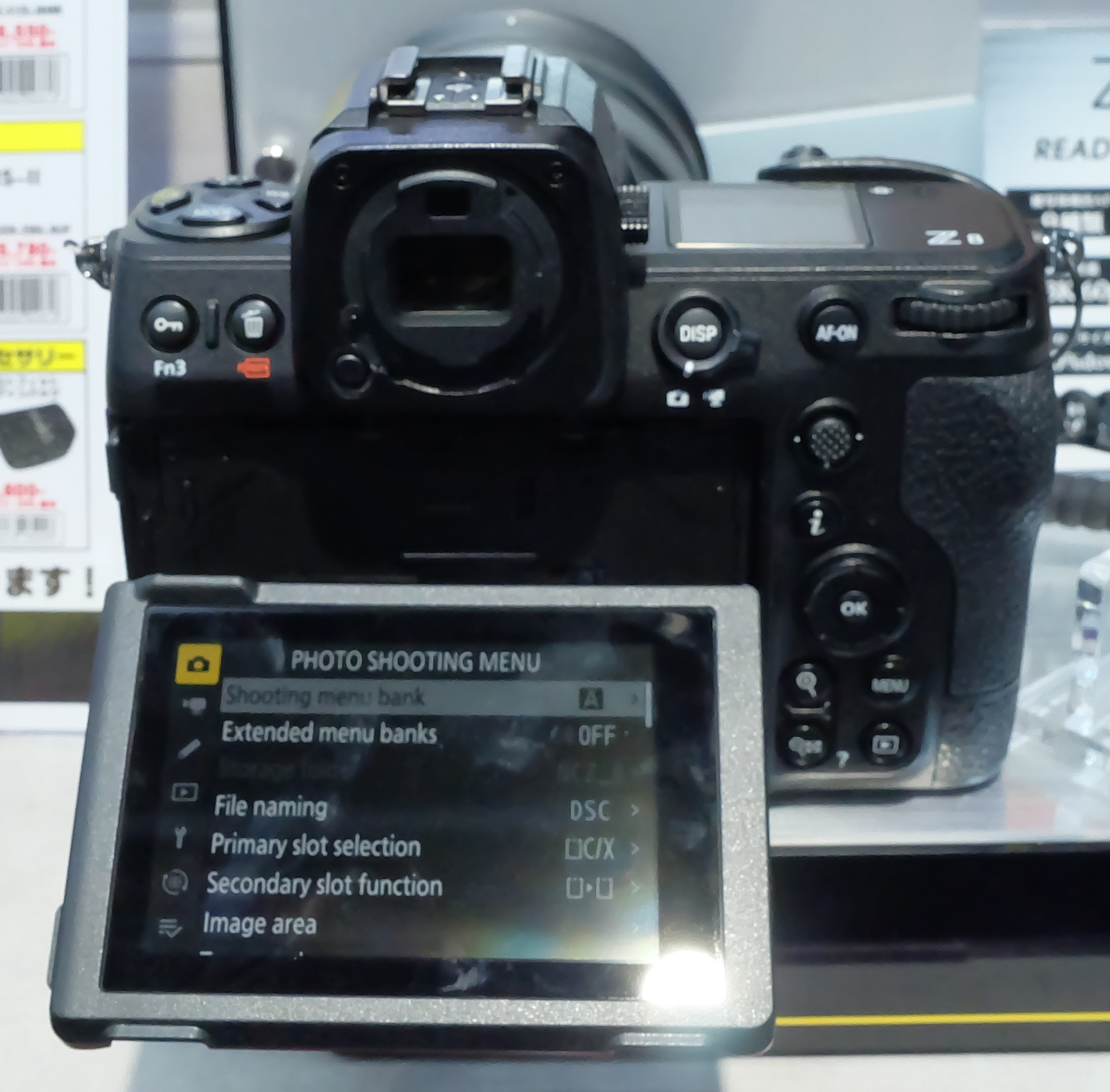

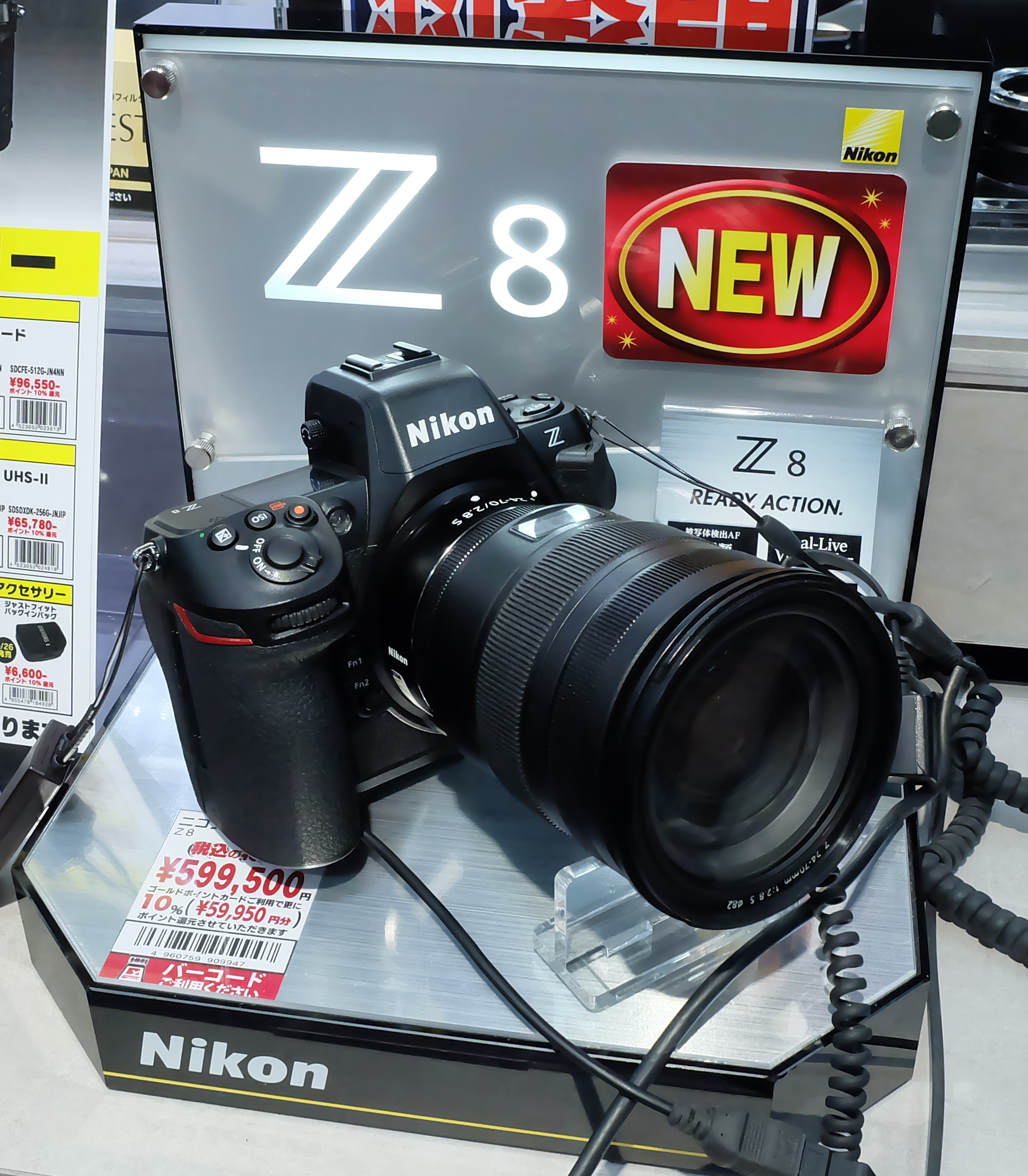

== Awards ==
The Z8 was awarded with:

- the TIPA World Awards 2024 in category Best Full Frame Professional Camera
- the EISA Camera of the Year 2023-2024 award
- the iF Design Award 2024.

Sensor	Class	2018	2019	2020	2021	2022	2023	2024	2025	2026
FX (Full-frame)	Flagship					^{8K} Z9 ^{S}				
FX (Full-frame)	Flagship							^{8K} Z8 ^{S}		
FX (Full-frame)	Professional		^{4K} Z7 ^{S}		^{4K} Z7Ⅱ ^{S}					
FX (Full-frame)	Professional		^{4K} Z6 ^{S}		^{4K} Z6Ⅱ ^{S}				^{6K} Z6Ⅲ ^{S}	
FX (Full-frame)	Cinema									^{6K} ZR ^{S}
FX (Full-frame)	Enthusiast							^{4K} Zf ^{S}		
FX (Full-frame)	Enthusiast				^{4K} Z5 ^{S}					^{4K} Z5Ⅱ ^{S}
FX (Full-frame)	Entry-level									^{4K} Z5ⅡC ^{S}
DX (APS-C)	Enthusiast					^{4K} Zfc				
DX (APS-C)	Prosumer			^{4K} Z50					^{4K} Z50Ⅱ	
DX (APS-C)	Entry-level						^{4K} Z30			
Sensor	Class									
Sensor	Class	2018	2019	2020	2021	2022	2023	2024	2025	2026
