= Jean-Dominique Warnier =

Jean-Dominique Warnier (1920–1990) was an engineer in the Bull IT group. He developed and disseminated an innovative approach to the study of information systems during the 1970s. His work aims to express the fundamental laws of the rational processing of data in the service of human activities.

The Warnier method combines two disciplines: one scientific, by a rigorous application of mathematical logic; the other humanist, by the organization of a harmonious collaboration between the respective aptitudes of man and automata. This method applies to different areas such as: expression of needs, Systems design, programming, Computer production, organization of the company.

His discipline of reasoning, applied to the resolution of concrete problems, rests on three simple principles:

The data of a system constitute a "set" whose study is conducted by hierarchical subdivision. The organization of the processing is deduced from the hierarchical structure of the data. The sections to be used for the treatment are determined by the study of the outputs (results requested).

The Warnier/Orr diagram is named after him.
