= Ken Orr =

- Born: May 10, 1939
- Died: June 14, 2016 (aged 77)
- Education: Wichita State University BA 1960, University of Chicago MA 1963
- Occupation: Software engineer
- Employer(s): State of Kansas; Washington University in St. Louis; The Ken Orr Institute
- Known for: Warnier/Orr diagram

Kenneth T. Orr (May 10, 1939 – June 14, 2016) was an American software engineer, executive and consultant, known for his contributions in the field of software engineering to structured analysis and the Warnier/Orr diagram.

== Education ==
Orr received his BA in Mathematics and Physics in 1960 from Wichita State University, and his MA in Philosophy in 1963 from the University of Chicago.

== Career ==
Orr started his career as Director of Information Systems at the State of Kansas in 1970. In 1973 he founded his own firm Ken Orr & Associates, which he directed until 1985. He was Professor at the School of Technology and Information Management of the Washington University in St. Louis, where he directed its Center for the Innovative Application of Technology. From 1988 until his death he was President of the Ken Orr Institute. Beginning in 2000, Ken served as a Cutter Consortium Fellow and Senior Consultant. Ken Orr died on June 14, 2016.

== Publications ==
Books

- Orr, Ken (1977). Structured systems development. New York: Yourdon Press. ISBN 9780917072062.
- Orr, Ken (1981). Structured requirements definition. Topeka, Kansas: Ken Orr and Associates, Inc. ISBN 9780960588404.

Articles, a selection

- Orr, Ken; Gane, Chris; Yourdon, Edward; Chen, Peter P.; Constantine, Larry L. (April 1989). "Methodology: the experts speak". Byte. 14 (4): 221–233. ISBN 9781447134312.
- Orr, Ken (February 1998). "Data quality and systems theory". Communications of the ACM. 41 (2). Association for Computing Machinery: 66–71. doi:10.1145/269012.269023. S2CID 18740509.
- Orr, Ken (2002). "CMM versus agile development: Religious Wars and Software Development". Business Agility & Software Engineering (Agile Project Management Executive Report). 3 (7). Cutter Consortium. Word document version.
- Orr, Ken (May–June 2004). "Agile requirements: opportunity or oxymoron?". IEEE Software. 21 (3). IEEE Computer Society: 71–73. Bibcode:2004ISoft..21c..71O. doi:10.1109/MS.2004.1293075. S2CID 25069896.
