= David Hyerle =

American author

David Hyerle is an author and creator of a thought-organization methodology called Thinking Maps that is popular in public schools in the United States.

== Thinking Maps ==
In 1988, David Hyerle wrote Expand Your Thinking and introduced Thinking Maps. These are a set of techniques used in primary and secondary education with the intention of providing a common visual language to information structure. There are eight types of maps:

- Circle Map: used for defining in context
- Bubble Map: used for describing with adjectives
- Flow Map: used for sequencing and ordering events
- Brace Map: used for identifying part/whole relationships
- Tree Map: used for classifying or grouping
- Double Bubble Map: used for comparing and contrasting
- Multi-flow map: used for analysing causes and effects
- Bridge map: used for illustrating analogies

He believed that all K-12 educators teach the same thought processes regardless of grade level and regardless of what terms were used to refer to them. Thinking Maps were intended to standardize the language and visual organization used in education, which the company believed would close the achievement gap by establishing common ground. The idea was that if all children have the same background knowledge, less time would be spent teaching and re-teaching thought processes. Hyerle also thought these techniques would promote metacognition and continuous cognitive development over the course of a student's academic career.
