= Jones diagram =

Two-quadrant analogue of a Jones diagram showing the relationship between a camera's focal length, crop factor and angles of view for two aspect ratios via its effective focal length – for example, the yellow line shows that 18 mm on 3:2 APS-C is equivalent to 27 mm full-frame and yields a vertical angle of 48°, and so on

A Jones diagram is a type of Cartesian graph developed by Loyd A. Jones in the 1940s, where each axis represents a different variable. In a Jones diagram opposite directions of an axis represent different quantities, unlike in a Cartesian graph where they represent positive or negative signs of the same quantity. The Jones diagram therefore represents four variables. Each quadrant shares the vertical axis with its horizontal neighbor, and the horizontal axis with the vertical neighbor. For example, the top left quadrant shares its vertical axis with the top right quadrant, and the horizontal axis with the bottom left quadrant. The overall system response is in quadrant I; the variables that contribute to it are in quadrants II through IV.

== Jones diagrams in photography ==
FIG. 1 from U.S. Patent 6,484,631. "a graphical illustration of a Jones Diagram for calibrating user specified tone reproduction curve (TRC)"

A common application of Jones diagrams is in photography, specifically in displaying sensitivity to light with what are also called "tone reproduction diagrams". These diagrams are used in the design of photographic systems (film, paper, etc.) to determine the relationship between the light a viewer would see at the time a photo was taken to the light that a viewer would see looking at the finished photograph.

The Jones diagram concept can be used for variables that depend successively on each other. Jones's original diagram used eleven quadrants to show all the elements of his photographic system.

== See also ==
- Cobweb plot – similar diagram technique
