= Tone reproduction =

In the theory of photography, tone reproduction is the mapping of scene luminance and color to print reflectance or display luminance, with the aim of subjectively "properly" reproducing brightness and "brightness differences".

The reproduction of color scenes in black-and-white tones is one of the long-time concerns of photographers.

A tone reproduction curve is often referred to by its initials, TRC, and the 'R' is sometimes said to stand for response, as in tone response curve.

== In photography ==
In photography, the differences between an "objective" and "subjective" tone reproduction, and between "accurate" and "preferred" tone reproduction, have long been recognized. Many steps in the process of photography are recognized as having their own nonlinear curves, which in combination form the overall tone reproduction curve; the Jones diagram was developed as a way to illustrate and combine curves, to study and explain the photographic process.

The luminance range of a scene maps to the focal-plane illuminance and exposure in a camera, not necessarily directly proportionally, as when a graduated neutral density filter is used to reduce the exposure range to less than the scene luminance range. The film responds nonlinearly to the exposure, as characterized by the film's characteristic curve, or Hurter–Driffield curve; this plot of optical density of the developed negative versus the logarithm of the exposure (also called a D–logE curve) has central straight section whose slope is called the gamma of the film. The gamma can be controlled by choosing different films, or by varying the development time or temperature. Similarly, the light transmitted by the negative exposed a photographic paper and interacts with the characteristic curve of the paper to give an overall tone reproduction curve. The exposure of the paper is sometimes modified in the darkroom by dodging and/or burning-in, further complicating the overall tone reproduction, usually helping to map a wider dynamic range from a negative onto a narrower print reflectance range.

In digital photography, image sensors tend to be nearly linear, but these nonlinear tone reproduction characteristics are emulated in the camera hardware and/or processing software, via "curves".

== In printing ==
In printing, a tone reproduction curve is applied to a desired output-referred luminance value, for example to adjust for the dot gain of a particular printing method. Dot-based printing methods have a finite native dot size. The dot is not square, nor any other shape that when stacked together perfectly fills an image area; rather, the dot will be larger than its target area and overlap its neighbors to some extent. If it were smaller than its target area, it would not be possible to saturate the substrate. A tone reproduction curve is applied to the electronic image prior to printing, so that the reflectance of the print closely approximates a proportionality to the luminance intent implied by the electronic image.

It is easier to demonstrate the need for a TRC using halftoned printing methods such as inkjet, or xerographic technologies. However, the need also applies to continuous-tone methods such as photographic paper printing.

As an example, suppose one wants to print an area at 50% reflectance, assuming no ink is 100% reflective and saturated black ink is 0% (which of course they aren't). The 50% could be approximated using digital halftoning by applying a dot of ink at every other dot target area, and staggering the lines in a brick-like fashion. In a perfect world, this would cover exactly half of the page with ink and make the page appear to have 50% reflectivity. However, because the ink will bleed into its neighboring target locations, greater than 50% of the page will be dark. To compensate for this darkening, a TRC is applied and the digital image's reflectance value is reduced to something less than 50% dot coverage. When digital halftoning is performed, we will no longer have the uniform on-off-on-off pattern, but we will have another pattern that will target less than 50% of the area with ink. If the correct TRC was chosen, the area will have an average 50% reflectance after the ink has bled.

A TRC can be applied when doing color space conversion. For example, by default, when transforming from L*A*B* to CMYK, Photoshop applies an ICC profile for SWOP standard inks and 20% dot gain for coated paper.

== See also ==
- Curve (tonality)
- Dot gain
- Jones diagram
- Tone mapping
