= Diagrammatology =

Academic study of diagrams

Diagrammatology is the academic study of diagrams. It studies fundamental role played by the diagram in the communication and creation of knowledge. Diagrammatology is not only an interdisciplinary subject, but pan-historical and cross-cultural.

== Overview ==
The term diagrammatology is often used synonymously with diagrammatics, however diagrammatics tends to be more common place within the fields of Mathematics (especially logic), the sciences and technology. In contrast, diagrammatology is currently the term of choice for the arts and humanities, where it is closely associated with Charles Sanders Peirce's work on diagrammatic reasoning.

In the introduction to his seminal 2011 work "Diagrammatology", Frederik Stjernfelt describes the reasoning behind his use of the term:

"As a substitute for the neologism of 'diagrammatology', the title might equally have well have been 'diagrammatical reasoning'. But two things argued against such a choice: (1) a book with that title already exists (Glasgow et al. 1995, on the reemergence of diagrammatic representations in computer science), and, consequently (2) the close association of that title with diagrams in computer science specifically."

Stjernfelt attributes the term diagrammatology to the art historian W.J.T Mitchell, who, in a 1981 article entitled "Diagrammatology" writes of the need for "…something like a diagrammatology, a systematic study of the way that relationships among elements are represented and interpreted by graphic constructions"

The term diagrammatology was also used in the title of the 2010 publication "Studies in Diagrammatology and Diagram Praxis" by Olga Pombo and Alexander Gerner. This volume is a collection of papers given at the interdisciplinary workshop on diagrammatology and diagram praxis held at the University of Lisbon, 23 – 24 March 2009. The workshop was organised by the Research Project "Images in Science" of the centre for Philosophy of Science of the University of Lisbon (CFCUL), aiming to analyse the place of image and diagrammatic thinking in different epistemological and semiotic programs.

== Discussion ==
- Scientific presentations (1998-2014)
- Documents
- People
- The Culture of Diagram

== Relevant Academic papers ==
- Peirce, Charles S. (1976). New Elements of Mathematics, (ed. by C. Eisele), Volumes I-IV, The Hague: Mouton.
- Peirce, Charles S. (1998). Collected Papers of Charles Sanders Peirce, Volumes IVIII, (ed. by C. Hartshorne, P. Weiss, A. Burks). London: Thoemmes Press.(Originally published in 1931-58.)
- Roberts, Don D. (1973). The Existential Graphs of Charles S. Peirce. The Hague: Mouton. 14
- Simons, Peter (1997). ―Higher Order Quantification and Ontological Commitment‖, Dialectica 51, 4, 255-271.
- Smith, Barry (1992) Characteristica Universalis, in K. Mulligan (ed.), Language, Truth and Ontology (Philosophical Studies Series), Dordrecht/Boston/London: Kluwer, 1992, 48–77. (2005). ―Against Fantology‖, in M. Reicher and J. Marek (eds.) Experience and Analysis, Vienna: ÖBV & HPT, 153-170.
- Smith, Barry (2003). ― Diagrams, Documents, and the Meshing of Plans‖, in A. Benedek and K. Nyíri (eds.) How To Do Things With Pictures: Skill, Practice, Performance, Frankfurt a. M.: Peter Lang Edition, 2013, 165-179.
- Stjernfelt, Frederik (2006). ―Two Iconicity Notions in Peirce's Diagrammatology‖, in Conceptual Structures: Inspiration and Application. Lecture Notes in Artificial Intelligence 4068, Berlin: Springer Verlag, 70-86.
- Stjernfelt, Frederik (2007). Diagrammatology. An Investigation on the Borderlines of Phenomenology, Ontology, and Semiotics, Synthese Library 336, Dordrecht: Springer Verlag.
- Bain, Alexander (1870). Logic. London: Longmans. New York: D. Appleton & Co.
- Gilman, Benjamins Ives (1892). ―On the Properties of a One-dimensional Manifold‖. Mind 1, 518-526.
- Gray, Jeremy (2009). Plato's Ghost: The Modernist Transformation of Mathematics. Princeton: Princeton University Press.
- Hartimo, Mirja (2007). ―Towards Completeness: Husserl on Theories of Manifolds 1890-1901‖. Synthese 156, 281-310.
- Lange, Friedrich Albert (1877). Logische Studien: Ein Beitrag Zur Neubegrundung Der Formalen Logik Und Der Erkenntnisstheorie. Iserlohn.
- Mancosu, Paolo, Zach, Richard, Badesa, Calixto (2009). ―The Development of Mathematical Logic from Russell to Tarski, 1900-1935‖, in Haaparanta, Leila (ed.), The Development of Modern Logic. Oxford: Oxford University Press, 318-470. 29
- Peirce, Charles S. (1931–58). Collected Papers of Charles Sanders Peirce. 8 volumes. Ed. by Charles Hartshorne, Paul Weiss, and A. W. Burks. Cambridge, Mass.: Harvard University Press. Cited as CP x.yyy.
- Peirce, Charles S. (1967). Manuscripts in the Houghton Library of Harvard University, as identified by Richard Robin, ―Annotated Catalogue of the Papers of Charles S. Peirce‖, Amherst: University of Massachusetts Press, 1967, and in ―The Peirce Papers: A supplementary catalogue‖, Transactions of the C. S. Peirce
- Society 7 (1971): 37–57. Cited as MS followed by manuscript number. Pietarinen, Ahti-Veikko (2005). ―Compositionality, Relevance and Peirce‘s Logic of Existential Graphs‖. Axiomathes 15, 513-540.
- Pietarinen, Ahti-Veikko (2006). Signs of Logic: Peircan Themes on the Philosophy of Language, Games, and Communication (Synthese Library 329). Dordrecht: Springer.
- Pietarinen, Ahti-Veikko (2010a). ―Which Philosophy of Mathematics is Pragmaticism?‖, in M. Moore (ed.), New Essays on Peirce's Mathematical Philosophy. Chicago: Open Court, 59-79.
- Pietarinen, Ahti-Veikko (2010b). ―Pragmaticism as an Anti-foundationalist Philosophy of Mathematics‖, in B. Van Kerkhove, R. Desmet and J. P. Van Bendegem (eds.), Philosophical Perspectives on Mathematical Practice, London: College Publications, 156-183.
- Pietarinen, Ahti-Veikko (2011a). ―Moving Pictures of Thought: Graphs, Games, and Pragmaticism's Proof‖, Semiotica, 186, 315-331.
- Pietarinen, Ahti-Veikko (2011b). ―Existential Graphs: What the Diagrammatic Logic of Cognition Might Look Like‖, History and Philosophy of Logic 32(3), 265-281.30
- Pietarinen, Ahti-Veikko & Snellman, Lauri (2006). ―On Peirce's Late Proof of Pragmaticism‖, in T. Aho and A.-V. Pietarinen (eds), Truth and Games, Helsinki: Acta Philosophica Fennica 78, 275-288.
- Roberts, Don D. (1973). The Existential Graphs of Charles S. Peirce. The Hague: Mouton.
- Sandu, Gabriel and Hintikka, Jaakko (1999). ―Tarski's Guilty Secret: Compositionality‖, in J. Wolenski and E. Kölher (eds.), Alfred Tarski and the Vienna Circle, Kluwer Academic Publishers, 217-230.
- Spiegelberg, Herbert (1956). ―Husserl's and Peirce's Phenomenologies: Coincidence or Interaction?‖, Philosophy and Phenomenological Research 17,164-185.
- Mitchell WJT (Spring, 1981) Diagrammatologoy, Critical inquiry 7(3):622-33
