= Chord diagram =

A chord diagram may refer to:

- Chord diagram (music), a diagram showing the fingering of a chord on a guitar or other fretted musical instrument
- Chord diagram (information visualization), a diagram showing a many-to-many relationship between objects as curved arcs within a circle
- Chord diagram (mathematics), a circularly ordered set with a one-to-one pairing, often drawn as chords of a circle
