= Williot diagram =

The Williot diagram is a graphical method to obtain an approximate value for the displacement of a structure subjected to a certain load. The method consists of, from a graph representation of a structural system, representing the structure's fixed vertices as a single, fixed starting point and from there sequentially adding the neighbouring vertices' relative displacements due to strain.
