= Systematic layout planning =

The systematic layout planning (SLP) - also referred to as site layout planning - is a tool used to arrange a workplace in a plant by locating areas with high frequency and logical relationships close to each other. The process permits the quickest material flow in processing the product at the lowest cost and least handling. It is used in construction projects to optimize the location of temporary facilities (such as engineers' caravans, material storage, generators, etc.) during construction to minimize transportation, minimize cost, minimize travel time, and enhance safety.

== Levels of plant layout design ==
There are four levels of detail in plant layout design,

1. Site layout: shows how the building should be located in a proper way.
2. Block layout: shows the sizes of departments in the buildings.
3. Detailed layout: shows the arrangements of equipment and workstations in the departments.
4. Workstation layout: shows the locations of every part of the workstation.
