= Curve (tonality) =

Image tonality remapping function

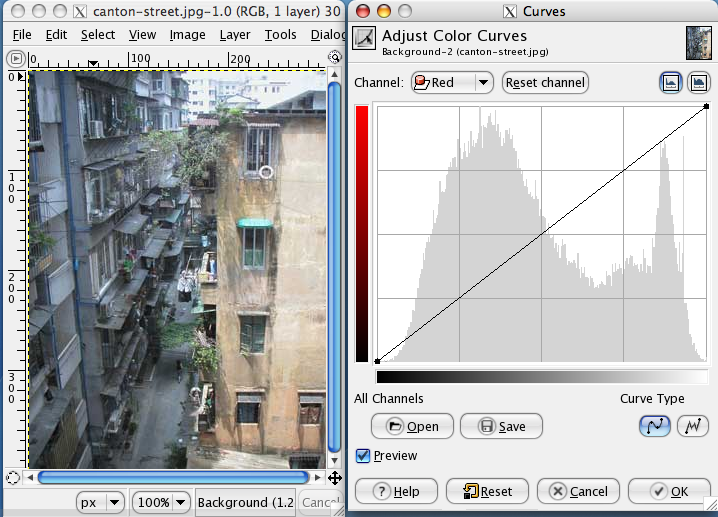
Photo and curve dialog in the GIMP

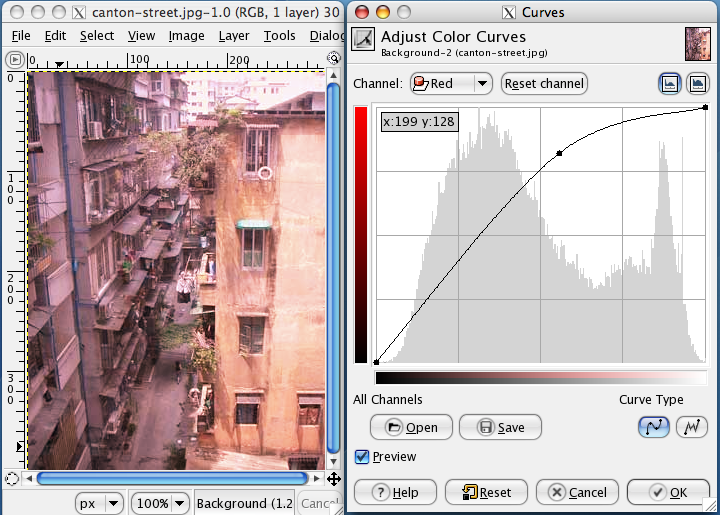
Photo and curve dialog with red colour emphasized in the lighter end of the spectrum.

In image editing, a curve is a remapping of image tonality, specified as a function from input level to output level, used as a way to emphasize colours or other elements in a picture.

Curves can usually be applied to all channels together in an image, or to each channel individually.

Applying a curve to all channels typically changes the brightness in part of the spectrum. Light parts of a picture can be easily made lighter and dark parts darker to increase contrast.

Applying a curve to individual channels can be used to stress a colour. This is particularly efficient in the Lab colour space due to the separation of luminance and chromaticity, but it can also be used in RGB, CMYK or whatever other colour models the software supports.

== See also ==
- Blend modes
- Image histogram
- Hurter–Driffield curve
- Tone reproduction curve
