= List of Unified Modeling Language tools =

This article compares UML tools. UML tools are software applications which support some functions of the Unified Modeling Language.

== General ==
Name	Creator	Platform / OS	First public release	Latest stable release	Open source	Software license	Programming language used
ArgoUML	Tigris.org	Cross-platform (Java)	1998-04	2011-12-15	Yes	EPL	Java, C++ (as module)
Astah	Change Vision, Inc.	Windows, macOS, Linux	2009-10-19	2026-07-15 (v12)	No	Commercial, perpetual or subscription. Free for students	Java
ATL	Obeo, INRIA; Free software community	Cross-platform (Java)	Unknown	2020-06-22 (4.2.1)	Yes	EPL	Java
BOUML	Bruno Pagès	Cross-platform	2005-02-26	2025-02-28	No	Free from v7.0, Commercial starting from v5.0 up to v6.12, GPL before v5.0	C++/Qt and Java ("plug-out")
Cacoo	Nulab	Windows 7+, Mac OS X	2010-10	Website frequently updated	No	Commercial, Free edition available	HTML5
CaseComplete	Serlio Software	Windows	2004	2020 (v15)	No	Commercial	C#
ConceptDraw PRO	CS Odessa	Windows, macOS	1993	2017-11-07 (v11)	No	Commercial	Unknown
Creately	Cinergix	Windows, Mac OS X	2008	Website frequently updated	No	Commercial, Free edition available	HTML5
crystal-facet-uml	Andreas Warnke	Windows, Linux	2016	2026	Yes	Apache License	C
Dia	Alexander Larsson/GNOME Office	Cross-platform (GTK+)	1998-08-31	2014-09-05 (v0.97.3)	Yes	GPL	C
Diagrams.net previously Draw.io	JGraph Ltd.	Windows, Linux, macOS, Chrome	2016-09-06	Website frequently updated	No	Free, Commercial, Modified Apache v2	Javascript, Java
Eclipse UML2 Tools	Eclipse Foundation	Cross-platform (Java)	2007	2020-03-02 (v5.5.1)	Yes	EPL	Java
Enterprise Architect	Sparx Systems	Windows (supports Linux and macOS installation)	2000	2023-03-02 (v16.1 Build 1625)	No	Commercial	C++
Gliffy	Gliffy by Perforce	Chrome, Safari, Firefox, Internet Explorer 9+	2006-08-01	Website frequently updated	No	Commercial, Free trial	HTML5 and JavaScript
JDeveloper	Oracle Corporation	Cross-platform (Java)	Unknown	2019-09 (v12c 12.2.1.4.0)	No	Freeware	Java
JetUML	Martin P. Robillard	Cross-platform (Java)	2015-01-23	2020-12-04 (v3.1)	Yes	GPL	Java
Lucidchart	Lucid Software	Windows, macOS, Linux, Solaris	2008-12	Website frequently updated	No	Commercial / Free (educational)	HTML5 and JavaScript
MagicDraw	No Magic, a Dassault Systèmes company	Windows Vista SP2 and later, OS X Mountain Lion and later, or Linux	1998	2021-02-12 (2021x)	No	Commercial	Java
Together	OpenText	Cross-platform (Java)	1998	2013 (v12.6)	No	Commercial	Java
Microsoft Visio	Microsoft	Windows	1992	2016 (v16.0)	No	Commercial	Unknown
Microsoft Visual Studio	Microsoft	Windows	1997-02	2016-06-27	No	Community & Express editions: Registerware; Enterprise, Professional & Others editions: Trialware	C++, C#
Modelio	Modeliosoft (SOFTEAM Group)	Windows, Linux, macOS	2009	2023-03-31 (5.3.1)	Yes	Core tool: GPL, Extensions: Apache License, Commercial	Java
MyEclipse	Genuitec	Windows, Linux	2003	Unknown	No	Commercial	Java
NClass	Balazs Tihanyi	Windows, macOS, Linux, Unix	2006-10-15	2019-09-27 (v2.7.0)	Yes	GPL	C#
NetBeans	Oracle Corporation	Windows, macOS, Linux, Unix	1996	2021-03-12	Yes	CDDL or GPL2	Java
Open ModelSphere	Grandite	Cross-platform (Java)	2002-02	2009-11-04	Yes	GPL	Java
Papyrus	Commissariat à l'Énergie Atomique, Atos Origin	Windows, Linux, macOS (Java)	2013-06-27	2023-03-15 (v6.4.0)	Yes	EPL	Java
PlantUML	Arnaud Roques	Cross-platform (Java)	2009-04-17	2023-07-12 (v1.2023.10)	Yes	GPL	Java
PowerDesigner	Sybase	Windows	1989	2018	No	Commercial	Unknown
PragmaDev Studio	PragmaDev	Windows, Linux, OS X	2002	2018-02-07	No	Free, Commercial	Python, C, C++
Prosa UML Modeller	Insoft Oy	Windows	1996	2013-10-19	No	Commercial	C/C++
Rational Rose XDE	IBM	Windows, Linux, Unix	Unknown	Unknown	No	IBM EULA	Unknown
Rational Software Architect	IBM	Windows, Linux	Unknown	2015-09-18	No	IBM EULA	Java/C++
Rational Software Modeler	IBM	Windows, Linux	2004-10-13	2008-09	No	IBM EULA	Unknown
Rational System Architect	IBM	Windows	Unknown	2013-03-15	No	Commercial	Unknown
Reactive Blocks	Bitreactive	Windows, macOS, Linux	2011-11-13	2016-09-16	No	Commercial, Free Community Edition	Java
Rhapsody	IBM	Windows, Linux	1996	2019-04-23 (8.4.0) - 2019-12-15 (8.4 Interim Fix 2)	No	Commercial	C, C++, Java, Ada
Software Ideas Modeler	Dusan Rodina	Windows (.NET), Linux (Mono)	2009-08-06	2024-05-28	No	Commercial, Freeware for non-commercial use	C#
StarUML	MKLab	Windows, macOS, Linux	2005-11-01	2023-01-12 (v5.1)	No	Commercial, You can evaluate for free without time limit	V5 Java
Umbrello UML Modeller	Umbrello Team	Unix-like; Windows	2003-01-24	2022-10-22 (v2.34)	Yes	GPL	C++, KDE
UML Designer	Obeo	Windows, macOS, Linux	2012	2019-01-30 (v9.0.0)	Yes	EPL	Java, Sirius
UMLet	The UMLet Team	Windows, macOS, Linux	2005-11-05	2018-08-05 (v14.3)	Yes	GPL	Java
UModel	Altova	Windows	2005-05	2019-10-9	No	Commercial	Java, C#, C++, Visual Basic
Umple	University of Ottawa	Cross-platform; Java	2008	2026-10-13 (v1.38.0)	Yes	MIT License	Java, PHP, JavaScript
WhiteStarUML	janszpilewski	Windows 7–10	2011-12-18	2018-03-25 (v5.9.1)	Yes	GPL2	Delphi
yEd	yWorks GmbH	Windows, macOS, Linux, Unix	Unknown	2021-03-11 (v3.21)	No	Free	Java
Name	Creator	Platform / OS	First public release	Latest stable release	Open source	Software license	Programming language used

== Features ==
Name	UML 2	MDA	XMI	Templates	Languages generated	Languages reverse engineered	Can be integrated with	Details
ArgoUML	No	Yes	Yes	Unknown	C++, C#, Java, PHP4, PHP5, Ruby	Java (other languages with plugins)	Unknown	Closely follows the UML standard
Astah	Yes	No	Yes	Yes	Java, C++, C#, Python, Ruby and any other languages with plugins	Java, C++, C#, PHP	MS Office, plantUML, Mermaid.js, miro, FreeMind, yUML and Redmine	Mind Mapping, ER Diagram, DFD, Flowchart, CRUD, Traceability Map, Requirement Diagram and Requirement table. Provides API and Plugins, RTF, HTML Export.
ATL	Yes	No	Yes	No	Unknown	Unknown	Available from the Eclipse M2M project (Model to Model).	Can transform UML & EMF models into other models. It has a repository of transformations called ZOO about a large set of common industrial concerns and educational labs.
Together	Yes	Yes	No	Yes	Java 6, C++, COBOL, CORBA	Unknown	JBuilder, Eclipse and MS VS.NET 2005	
BOUML	Yes	Yes	Yes	Yes	C++, Java, PHP, IDL, Python, MySQL	C++, Java, PHP, MySQL	Unknown	UML 2. Solid code roundtrip, fast. Extensible through "plug-outs" written in C++ or Java
Cacoo	Yes	Unknown	Unknown	Yes	Unknown	Unknown	Google Drive, Google Docs, Typetalk, Adobe Creative Cloud, Slack, Atlassian Confluence, Dropbox, Visio, Box.	
CaseComplete	No	No	Export	No	No	No	Microsoft Azure DevOps, Jira, Requirements.cc, Excel, Word	Provides management of actors, use cases, user stories, declarative requirements, and test scenarios. Includes glossary, data dictionary, and issue tracking. Supports use case diagrams, auto-generated flow diagrams, screen mock-ups, and free-form diagrams.
clang-uml	Unknown	Unknown	Unknown	Unknown	No	C++	PlantUML, Mermaid.js	Generate PlantUML and Mermaild.js diagrams from existing C++ codebase.
crystal-facet-uml	Yes	No	Export	No	html, docbook	No	git branch/merge, svn, json-parser	UML 2.5.1, SysML 1.5, model-based, auto-layouting, tree-structured, searchable
Dia	Partly	No	No	No	Included Python script codegen.py 'export filter' to Python, C++, JavaScript, Pascal, Java, PHP; external tools add Ada, C, PHP5, Ruby, shapefile, C#, SQL (Sybase, Postgres, Oracle, DB/2, MS-SQL, MySQL, ...)	No	No	Uses Python as scripting language
Diagrams.net	Yes	Unknown	Unknown	Unknown	Unknown	Unknown	Atlassian Confluence, JIRA ...	Unknown
Eclipse UML2 Tools	Yes	Yes	Yes	Yes	Java (or Eclipse project supported?)	Java (or Eclipse project supported?)	Eclipse	Ten UML 2 diagram types.
Enterprise Architect	Yes	Yes	Yes	Supports MDA templates and Code Generation templates	ActionScript, C, C#, C++, Delphi, Java, PHP, Python, Visual Basic, Visual Basic .NET, DDL, EJB, XML Schema, Ada, VHDL, Verilog, WSDL, BPEL, Corba IDL	ActionScript, C, C#, C++, Delphi, Java, PHP, Python, Visual Basic, Visual Basic .NET, DDL, XML Schema, WSDL	Eclipse & Visual Studio	UML 2.5, SysML, BPMN, SoaML, SOMF, WSDL, XSD, ArchiMate. Frameworks: UPDM, Zachman, TOGAF. Forward and Reverse Engineering for code and Database. Model Driven Integrated Development (Edit/Build/Debug) for Java, .Net, PHP & GNU compilers. Simulates Activity, State Machine, Sequence and BPMN diagrams.
Gliffy	Yes	Unknown	Unknown	Yes	No	No	Google apps, Google drive, JIRA, Confluence	Has libraries of shapes for: UML class, sequence, activity, use case and more.
JetUML	Yes	Unknown	Unknown	Unknown	Java	Unknown	Unknown	JetUML is designed for fast diagramming with a minimalist feature set.
Lucidchart	Unknown	Unknown	Unknown	Unknown	Unknown	Unknown	Google Drive, Google Apps, JIRA, Confluence, Jive, and Box.	
MagicDraw	Yes	Yes	Yes	Yes	Java, C++, C#, CIL, CORBA IDL, DDL, EJB, XML Schema, WSDL	Java, C++, C#, CIL, CORBA IDL, DDL, EJB, XML Schema, WSDL	Eclipse, EMF, NetBeans	UML 2.3, Full round-trip support for Java, C++, C#, CL (MSIL) and CORBA IDL, Report generator from template in RTF, HTML, XML, ODT, ODS, ODP, and Text (DOCX, XLSX, PPTX since 16.8).
Microsoft Visio	Plugin	Unknown	Plugin	Plugin	Unknown	Unknown	Unknown	
Modelio	Yes	Yes	Yes	Yes	Java, C++, C#, XSD, WSDL, SQL	Java, C++, C#	Eclipse, EMF	Full UML2, BPMN2, ArchiMate3. Documentation generation in HTML.Extensions providing documentation generation in Open XML format, support for TOGAF, SysML, SoaML, Hibernate, OMG MARTE standard. Support of model fragments for collaboration. Support of design patterns.
MyEclipse	Unknown	Unknown	Unknown	Unknown	Unknown	Unknown	Unknown	
NClass	Unknown	Unknown	Unknown	Unknown	C#, Java	C#, Java	Unknown	
NetBeans	Unknown	Unknown	Unknown	Unknown	Java	Java	Unknown	Has to be installed as a plug in to enable the UML modeling.
Open ModelSphere	No	Unknown	Unknown	Yes	Java, SQL	Java	Unknown	Supports data, business-process and UML modeling
Papyrus	Yes	Unknown	Yes	Unknown	Ada 2005, C/C++, Java addins	Unknown	Eclipse	
PlantUML	Yes	Unknown	Export	Unknown	Unknown	C#, grails, Java, Lua, PHP, SqlALchemy	Chrome, Word, Open Office, Google Docs, J2EE Servlet, JQuery, Sublime, Eclipse, NetBeans, IntelliJ, LaTeX, Emacs, Doxygen, etc.	Creates diagrams using simple text language. Sequence, use case, class, activity, component, state, object, and UI mock diagrams are supported. Outputs images in PNG or SVG format.
PowerDesigner	Yes	Yes	Yes	Yes	Java, C#, VB .NET	Unknown	Eclipse	Data-modeling, business-process modeling - round trip engineering
PragmaDev Studio	Yes	Yes	Partial	No	C, C++	No	Integration with Reqtify traceability tool. Model simulator integrated with any FMI 2.0 supporting tool. Generated code can be integrated on the following RTOS: VxWorks, FreeRTOS, ThreadX, CMX, OSE Delta, OSE epsilon, uITRON 3, uITRON 4, Nucleus, posix, win32.	Dedicated to modeling and testing of communicating systems. Based on ITU-T Z.109 UML profile, SDL-RT, SDL. The model can be simulated and can be exported to model checking tools. Full testing environment integrated based on TTCN-3.
Prosa UML Modeller	Yes	Yes	Open modelbase	Yes	C++ Java, C#, SQL DDL and SQL queries	C++ Java and C# class headers are synchronized between diagrams and code in real-time	Programmer's workbenches, documentation tools, version control systems	Supports following UML diagrams: Use case diagram, Sequence diagram, Collaboration diagram, Class diagram, Statechart diagram, Activity diagram, Component diagram, Deployment diagram and Package diagram
Rational Rose XDE	No	Unknown	Unknown	Unknown	Unknown	Unknown	Unknown	
Rational Software Architect	Yes	Yes	Yes	Unknown	Java, C#, C++, EJB, WSDL, XSD, IDL, SQL	Java, C++, .NET	Eclipse	
Rational Software Modeler	Yes	Yes	Unknown	Unknown	Unknown	Unknown	Eclipse	
Rational System Architect	No	Unknown	Export	Unknown	C++, Java, WSDL	C++, Java, WSDL	Unknown	
Reactive Blocks	Yes	No	Yes	No	Java	Unknown	Eclipse	Code generation from Activity Diagrams for J2SE, OSGi, Kura, and ESF, unit testing via JUnit, supports formal analysis and state space simulation
Rhapsody	Yes	Yes	Yes	Yes	C++, C, Java, Ada, Corba, Customizable for other languages	C++, C, Java, Ada, Customizable for other languages	Visual Studio, Eclipse, TcSE, WindRiver, Green Hills, QNX, Linux, Mathworks Simulink, DOORS, customizable for others	Targets real-time or embedded systems and software using industry standard languages (UML, SysML, AUTOSAR, DoDAF, MODAF, UPDM, DDS), full production-quality code generation (structural, behavioral, functional), simulation, model based testing, integration with numerous real time operating systems and IDE's
Software Ideas Modeler	Yes	Yes	Yes	Yes	ActionScript, C++, C#, Delphi, Java, JavaScript, PHP, Python, Ruby, SQL DDL, VB.NET, VB6, XSD	C++, C#, VB.NET, Java, Object Pascal, PHP, Ruby	Unknown	UML, BPMN, SysML, ArchiMate, JSD, Data Flow Diagram, Flowchart, Robustness Diagram, CRC, ERD, Mixed Diagram, HTA, UI, Venn, Behavior Tree, Structure Chart, Decision Table, Roadmap, Computer Network Diagram, Layer Diagram, Web Page Diagram, Grafcet, custom diagrams
StarUML	Yes	Yes	Import	Yes	Java, C#, C++	Java, C++, C# Code Generator and Reverse Engineer	JavaScript, Node.js	Plug-in architecture: JavaScript, HTML5, Node.js
Umbrello UML Modeller	Yes	Yes	Yes	Unknown	C++, Java, Perl, PHP, Python ... 16	C++, IDL, Pascal/Delphi, Ada, Python, Java; import XMI, RoseMDL	KDE	XML Metadata Interchange file format support. Generates code for various languages, including: ActionScript, Ada, C++, C#, D, IDL, Java, JavaScript, MySQL (SQL), Pascal, Perl, PHP, PHP5, PostgreSQL(SQL), Python, Ruby, SQL, Tcl, Vala, XMLSchema (Some are outdated) ERD for MySQL, PostgresSQL
UML Designer	Yes	Yes	Yes	Unknown	Any kind of languages as it is compatible with code generator tools like Eclipse UMLGenerators or Acceleo	Any kind of languages supported by Eclipse UML Generators	Eclipse	Open source under EPL license, based on Eclipse, EMF, Sirius
UMLet	No	No	No	No	No	Java	Eclipse, Visual Studio Code	Source/text focused simple modeling tool
UModel	Yes	Yes	Yes	Yes	Java, C#, C++, Visual Basic	Java, C#, C++, Visual Basic	Eclipse, Visual Studio	Also supports business process modeling, SysML, and database modeling
Umple	Class, State, Composite Structure only	No	Yes	Yes	Java, Python, PHP, C++, SQL, Alloy, NuSMV, yUML, USE	Java	Command-line tools, Embeddable in web pages, Eclipse	Input or export can be by diagram or Umple textual form, separation of concerns (aspects, traits, mixins), embeds action code in Java and other languages, written in itself, documentation generation, plugin architecture for generators
WhiteStarUML	Yes	Yes	Import	Yes	Java 1.5, C#, C++, SQL	Java 1.5, C#, C++, SQL	Unknown	WhiteStarUml is a fork of StarUML with an intent to revive its Delphi code base by updating code to recent Delphi editions, reducing dependence on third party components and fixing bugs and adding new features.
yEd	Unknown	No	No	Unknown	Unknown	Unknown	Unknown	
Name	UML 2	MDA	XMI	Templates	Languages generated	Reverse engineered languages	Can be integrated with	Details

== See also ==
- List of requirements engineering tools
