= List of SysML tools =

This article compares SysML tools. SysML tools are software applications which support some functions of the Systems Modeling Language.

== General ==
Name	Creator	Platform / OS	First public release	Latest stable releaseEclipse Public License 2.0	Open source	Software license	Programming language used
Astah SysML	Change Vision, Inc.	Windows, macOS	2013-06-28	2026-03-03 (v11)	No	Commercial	Java
Cameo Systems Modeler	3DS Catia, No Magic	Windows, Linux, macOS				Commercial	Java
Capella	Thales Group & Eclipse Foundation community	Windows, Linux, macOS	2015-04-06	2025-03-24 (v7.0.1)	Yes	EPL	Java
ConceptDraw PRO	CS Odessa	Windows, macOS	1993	2017-11-07 (v11)	No	Commercial	Unknown
Enterprise Architect	Sparx Systems	Windows (supports Linux and macOS installation)	2000	2023-09-26 (v16.1 Build 1628)	No	Commercial	C++
MagicDraw	No Magic, a Dassault Systèmes company	Windows, Windows Server, Linux, Mac OS X (Java SE 11-compatible)	1998	2022-07-01 (2022x)	No	Commercial	Java
Microsoft Visio	Microsoft	Windows	1992	2024 (v16.0)	No	Commercial	Unknown
Modelio	Modeliosoft (SOFTEAM Group)	Windows, Linux, macOS	2009	2023-12-07 (5.4.1)	Yes	Core tool: GPL, Extensions: Apache License	Java
Papyrus	Commissariat à l'Énergie Atomique, Atos Origin	Windows, Linux, macOS (Java)	2013-06-27	2020-06 (v4.8.0)	Yes	EPL	Java
Rhapsody	IBM	Windows, Linux	1996	2024-09-12 (10.0.1)	No	Commercial	C, C++, Java, Ada
Software Ideas Modeler	Dusan Rodina	Windows, Linux	2009-08-06	2021-07-27	No	Commercial, Freeware	C#
SysMLv2 Editor	Change Vision, Inc.	Windows, Linux, macOS	2025-05-29	2026-07-15 (v1.13.2)	No	Commercial	TypeScript
SysON	Obeo & CEA List	Web	2023	2024.11	Yes	Eclipse Public License	Java
System Architect	UNICOM Global	Windows	1988 & 2005 (for SA XT web version)	2022-10-18	No	Commercial	C++ and Visual Basic; JavaScript for SA XT web sister product
System Architecture Modeler	Ansys	Windows, Linux, macOS	July 2024 - 2024 R2	February 2025 - 2025 R1	No	Commercial	Java
UModel	Altova	Windows	2005-05	2020-03-17 (v2020r2)	No	Commercial	Java, C#, Visual Basic
Name	Creator	Platform / OS	First public release	Latest stable release	Open source	Software license	Programming language used

== Features ==
Name	Underlying data model	Full and Latest SysML support	Full and Latest UML support	XMI	Automated document generation	OSLC support	Can be integrated with
Astah SysML	Yes	Partial	Subset of UML diagrams	Yes	Yes	No	Cameo Systems Modeler
Capella	No	Partial	Unknown	Yes	Plugin	Plugin	DOORS and Polarion through Publication for Capella, Teamcenter through System Modeling Workbench
Enterprise Architect	Yes	Yes	Unknown	Yes	Yes	Yes	DOORS through the Model Driven Generation (MDG) Link for DOORS.
MagicDraw	Yes	Yes	Yes	Yes	Yes	Yes	DOORS and Micro Focus Application Lifecycle Management through Cameo DataHub. Teamcenter integration with the Teamcenter Integration Plugin.
Microsoft Visio	No	No	Pro versions	Plugin	No	No	No
Modelio	Yes	Partial	Unknown	Yes	Yes	No	No
Papyrus	Yes	Yes	Yes	Unknown	Unknown	No	Unknown
Rhapsody	Yes	Partial	UML v1	Yes	Unknown	Yes	Unknown
Software Ideas Modeler	Yes	Yes	Unknown	Yes	Yes	No	Unknown
System Architect	Yes	Yes	Unknown	No	Yes	Yes	DOORS, RTC, UNICOM Focal Point, Rhapsody
UModel	Yes	Partial	Unknown	Unknown	Unknown	No	Unknown
Name	Underlying data model	Full and Latest SysML support	Full and Latest UML support	XMI	Automated document generation	OSLC support	Can be integrated with

== See also ==
- List of MBSE Tools
- List of SysML v2 Tools
