= Requirements engineering tools =

Requirements engineering tools are usually software products to ease the requirements engineering (RE) processes and allow for more systematic and formalized handling of requirements, change management and traceability.

The PMI guide Requirements Management: A Practical Guide recommends that a requirements tool should be identified at the beginning of the project, as [requirements] traceability can get complex and that switching tool mid-term could present a challenge.

According to ISO/IEC TR 24766:2009, six major tool capabilities exist:

1. Requirements elicitation
2. Requirements analysis
3. Requirements specification
4. Requirements verification and validation
5. Requirements management
6. Other capabilities

Note that INCOSE and Project Performance International (PPI) maintain an official database of tools, the Systems Engineering Tools Database (SETDB).

== RE tool list ==
As with most software, the vendor/owner, tool name or scope change over time.

Note that compliance with, for example, safety standards such as ISO 26262 is supported by few tools directly or indirectly via specialist consulting.

Unlike the major six tool capabilities (see above), the following categories are introduced for the list, which correlate closer with the product marketing or summarizes capabilities, such as requirements management (including the elicitation, analysis and specification parts) and test management (meaning verification & validation capabilities).

Specialties, such as OSLC-support, are not presented in the current list, but exist for some tools.

=== List capabilities ===
- Agile: The tool supports agile methodologies, such as Scrum, Kanban, collaborative working etc.
- ALM: Application lifecycle management (meaning, the tool offers a full set of capabilities or can be extended)
- CM: Configuration management (software or hardware)
- ISM: Issue resolution management (or problem resolution management)
- PDM: Product data management
- PLM: Product lifecycle management
- PJM: Project management
- RM: Requirements management incl. design, specification, etc.
- TM: Test management (QA)
- VCS: Version control system
- VM_MBSE: Visual/UI/UX modeling or MBSE (Model-based systems engineering)

==== Excluded capabilities (limited list) ====
- CI/CD
- Process management (project management) (Process design, etc.)
- QM: Quality management
- Risk management
- Release/Patch management
- Safety or Security
- Variants management

=== List ===
Name	Vendor	Scope/Capabilities*												License type
Name	Vendor	Agile	ALM	CM	ISM	PDM	PLM	PJM	RM	TM	VCS	VM_MBSE	Other	License type
acunote	Pluron Inc.	x												Commercial
agosense.fidelia	agosense GmbH								x					Commercial
Aha!	Aha! Labs					x			x					Commercial
Aligned Elements	Aligned AG		x						x	x				Commercial
ALM Octane	Micro Focus	x							x	x				Commercial
Auros IQ	Auros LLC	x			x	x	x	x	x		x	x	CAD	Commercial
Axosoft	Axosoft	x							x					Commercial
Azure DevOps	Microsoft	x	x		x				x	x				Commercial
Balsamiq Wireframes	Balsamiq								x			x		Commercial
BASIL The FuSa Spice	ELISA (A project of The Linux Foundation)	x	x						x	x	x	x		GNU GPL v2.0
Business Optix	Business Optix											x		Commercial
Cameo Systems Modeler	No Magic Inc. (since 2018 part of Dassault Systèmes)								x			x		Commercial
Capella	Eclipse Foundation											x		Eclipse Public License
CaseComplete	Serlio Software								x			x		Commercial
codebeamer ALM	Intland Software GmbH (part of PTC)	x	x						x	x				Commercial
Cognition Cockpit	Cognition Corporation					x		x	x	x				Commercial
Cradle	3SL							x	x			x		Commercial
Copilot4DevOps	Modern Requirements	x	x					x	x	x		x		Commercial
Dimensions RM	Micro Focus								x					Commercial
DocSheets	Goda Software	x	x						x	x				Commercial
Eclipse (IDE) Papyrus	Eclipse Foundation											x		Eclipse Public License
Enterprise Architect	Sparx Systems	x	x					x	x			x		Commercial
FRET		x							x					NASA open source
Helix RM	Perforce	x	x						x	x				Commercial
IBM ERM DOORS (textual req.)	IBM			x					x	x				Commercial
IBM ERM DOORS Next (Jazz)	IBM		x						x	x				Commercial
IBM Engineering Rhapsody (visual req., i.e. UML)	IBM		x						x	x		x		Commercial
innoslate	SPEC Innovations								x					Commercial
Innovator for Business Analysts	MID GmbH								x			x		Commercial
in-STEP BLUE	microTool GmbH							x	x	x				Commercial
iRise	iRise	x							x			x		Commercial
Jama Connect	Jama Software							x	x	x				Commercial
Jira	Atlassian	x			x			x	x					Commercial
Kanban Flow	CodeKick AB	x												Commercial
Kanban Tool	Shore Labs	x												Commercial
kanbanize	kanbanize	x							x					Commercial
Kovair ALM	Kovair Software, Inc.	x	x				x	x	x	x				Commercial
LeanKit	Planview, Inc.	x												Commercial
MagicDraw	No Magic Inc. (since 2018 part of Dassault Systemes)											x		Commercial
Matrix Req	Matrix Requirements GmbH	x	x	x	x				x	x	x			Commercial
Marvel App	Marvel	x								x		x		Commercial
Minerva PLM	Minerva Group A/S			x			x		x				x	Commercial
Modelio Analyst	Modeliosoft								x			x		Commercial
Modern Requirements4DevOps	Modern Requirements	x		x					x	x	x	x		Commercial
objectiF	microTool GmbH								x			x		Commercial
objectiF RPM	microTool GmbH	x						x	x			x		Commercial
OneDesk Product Management	OneDesk Inc.					x			x					Commercial
OpenPDM	PROSTEP Inc. (see also ProSTEP iViP)					x	x							Commercial
OpenProject	OpenProject GmbH	x						x						GPL3
OSRMT		x							x					GPL2
PivotalTracker	PivotalLabs	x												Commercial
Polarion	Siemens PLM Software	x	x		x			x	x	x	x			Commercial
PREEvision	Vector Informatik GmbH	x	x	x	x	x		x	x	x	x	x	Wiring, Communication, Server API	Commercial
Psoda	Psoda	x						x	x	x				Commercial
Quality Center	Micro Focus		x		x			x	x	x				Commercial
QVscribe	QVscribe								x					Commercial
R4J - Requirements Management for Jira	ease solutions Pte Ltd	x	x		x	x			x					Commercial
Rally Software	Broadcom	x							x					Commercial
RaQuest	SparxSystems Japan Co., Ltd								x					Commercial
Relatics	Relatics	x	x			x	x	x	x		x	x		Commercial
ReqEdit	REQTEAM GmbH								x					Commercial
ReqSuite RM	OSSENO Software GmbH								x					Commercial
ReQtest	ReQtest AB	x							x	x				Commercial
RequirementONE	RequirementOne Inc.								x					Commercial
Requirements Portal	Altium	x				x		x	x	x	x	x		Commercial
ReqView	Eccam s.r.o.	x							x		x			Commercial
Retina	Intland Software GmbH	x							x	x				Commercial
RMsis	Optimizory Technologies Pvt. Ltd.	x							x	x				Commercial
rmToo	flonatel GmbH & Co. KG	x							x					GPL3
RMTrak	Prometeo Technologies								x					Commercial
Scrumwise	x													Commercial
ScrumWorks Pro	CollabNet	x												Commercial
SOX2 RM	Engineers Consulting GmbH								x					Commercial
Specification Wizard	MeetAdd								x					Commercial
Spicy SE	Spicy SE		x	x					x	x	x	x	Arch	Commercial
SpiraTeam	Inflectra	x						x	x	x				Commercial
Stell	Stell Engineering, Inc.								x	x		x		Commercial
Storyteller	Blueprint Software Systems, Inc.								x			x		Commercial
storywise	ireo GmbH								x					Commercial
SwiftKanban	Digité Inc.	x												Commercial
Swiftly	Orca Intelligence	x	x						x		x	x		Commercial
Targetprocess	Targetprocess Inc.	x												Commercial
TraceabilityLite	vSuperb Ltd								x	x				Commercial
Tuleap Enterprise	enalean	x							x					Commercial
VersionOne	CollabNet	x				x			x					Commercial
Visual Paradigm	Visual Paradigm International	x										x		Commercial
Visure Requirements	Visure Solutions, Inc.				x				x	x				Commercial
Windchill RV&S	PTC								x	x				Commercial
Yodiz	Yodiz	x												Commercial
Yonix	Yonix Ltd.								x					Commercial

== Other tools, developments, specialities ==
- ReqInspector
- ReqIF - For example to transfer requirements data from one tool to another (e. g. DOORS to DOORS Next)
- Doorstop (hosted on GitHub)

== See also ==
- Application lifecycle management (ALM)
- ISO/IEC 12207
- List of SysML tools
- List of Unified Modeling Language tools
- Model-based systems engineering (MBSE)
- Open Services for Lifecycle Collaboration (OSLC)
- Product lifecycle management (PLM)
- Scope management
- Software development process
- Systems engineering tools
