= Graphviz =

Software package for graph visualization

- Developers: AT&T Labs Research and contributors
- Release: before 1991; 35 years ago
- Stable release: 16.1.1 / 8 November 2026; 1 day ago
- Written in: C
- Operating system: Linux, macOS, Windows
- Type: Graph visualization
- License: Eclipse Public License
- Website: graphviz.org
- Repository: gitlab.com/graphviz/graphviz

A red–black tree plotted by Graphviz

Undirected graph showing adjacency of the 48 contiguous United States

A visualization of a JavaScript life cycle made by using Graphviz

Graphviz (short for Graph Visualization Software) is a package of open-source tools initiated by AT&T Labs Research for drawing graphs (as in nodes and edges, not as in bar charts) specified in DOT language scripts having the file name extension "gv". It also provides libraries for software applications to use the tools. Graphviz is free software licensed under the Eclipse Public License.

== Tools ==
dot
a command-line tool to produce layered graph drawings in a variety of output formats, such as (PostScript, PDF, SVG, annotated text and so on).
neato
useful for undirected graphs up to about 1000 nodes. "Spring model" layout minimizes global energy.
fdp
force-directed graph drawing similar to "spring model", but minimizes forces instead of energy. Useful for undirected graphs.
sfdp
multiscale version of fdp for the layout of large undirected graphs.
twopi
for radial graph layouts. Nodes are placed on concentric circles depending on their distance from a given root node.
circo
circular layout. Suitable for certain diagrams of multiple cyclic structures, such as certain telecommunications networks.
dotty
a graphical user interface to visualize and edit graphs.
lefty
a programmable (in a language inspired by EZ) widget that displays DOT graphs and allows the user to perform actions on them with the mouse. Therefore, Lefty can be used as the view in a model–view–controller GUI application that uses graphs.
gml2gv, gv2gml
convert to/from GML, another graph file format.
graphml2gv
convert a GraphML file to the DOT format.
gxl2gv, gv2gxl
convert to/from GXL, another graph file format.

== Applications that use Graphviz ==
Notable applications of Graphviz include:

- ArgoUML's alternative UML diagram rendering called argouml-graphviz.
- AsciiDoc can embed Graphviz syntax as a diagram.
- Bison is able to output the grammar as dot for visualization of the language.
- Confluence has a Graphviz plugin to render diagrams from text descriptions.
- ConnectedText has a Graphviz plugin.
- Doxygen uses Graphviz to generate diagrams, including class hierarchies, collaboration and call trees for source code.
- FreeCAD uses Graphviz to display the dependencies between objects in documents.
- Gephi has a Graphviz plugin.
- Gramps uses Graphviz to create genealogical (family tree) diagrams.
- Graph-tool a Python library for graph manipulation and visualization.
- OmniGraffle version 5 and later uses the Graphviz engine, with a limited set of commands, for automatically laying out graphs.
- Org-mode can work with DOT source code blocks.
- PlantUML uses Graphviz to generate UML diagrams from text descriptions.
- Puppet can produce DOT resource graphs that can be viewed with Graphviz.
- Scribus is an open-source DTP program that can use Graphviz to render graphs by using its internal editor in a special frame type called render frame.
- Sphinx is a documentation generator that can use Graphviz to embed graphs in documents.
- Terraform an infrastructure-as-code tool from Hashicorp allows output of an execution plan as a DOT resource graph
- TOra a free-software database development and administration GUI, available under the GNU GPL.
- Trac wiki has a Graphviz plugin.
- Zim includes a plugin that allows adding and editing in-page diagrams using the Graphviz dot language.

== Version history ==
Date	Version
15 December 2000	1.7.4
7 February 2002	1.8.0
31 January 2003	1.9.0
3 July 2003	1.10.0
23 February 2004	1.11.0
1 March 2004	1.12.0
30 August 2004	1.14.0
14 September 2004	1.16.0
11 December 2004	1.18.0
11 December 2004	2.0.0
19 January 2005	2.2.0
20 July 2005	2.4.0
28 August 2005	2.6.0
3 February 2006	2.8.0
27 November 2006	2.10.0
5 December 2006	2.12.0
2 August 2007	2.14.0
9 November 2007	2.16.0
10 March 2008	2.18.0
20 June 2008	2.20.0
3 March 2009	2.22.0
16 June 2009	2.24.0
10 December 2009	2.26.0
6 May 2011	2.28.0
13 January 2013	2.30.0
1 August 2013	2.32.0
6 September 2013	2.34.0
11 January 2014	2.36.0
13 April 2014	2.38.0
20 December 2016	2.40.0
4 July 2019	2.42.0
8 April 2020	2.44.0
18 January 2021	2.46.0
16 March 2021	2.47.0
17 July 2021	2.48.0
28 August 2021	2.49.0
4 December 2021	2.50.0
26 February 2022	3.0.0
29 May 2022	4.0.0
7 July 2022	5.0.0
11 September 2022	6.0.1
23 October 2022	7.0.0
27 March 2023	8.0.1
11 September 2023	9.0.0
10 February 2024	10.0.1
28 April 2024	11.0.0
4 July 2024	12.0.0
8 June 2025	13.0.0

== See also ==
- Graph drawing
- Graph theory
- Microsoft Automatic Graph Layout
