= ArgoUML =

UML diagramming application

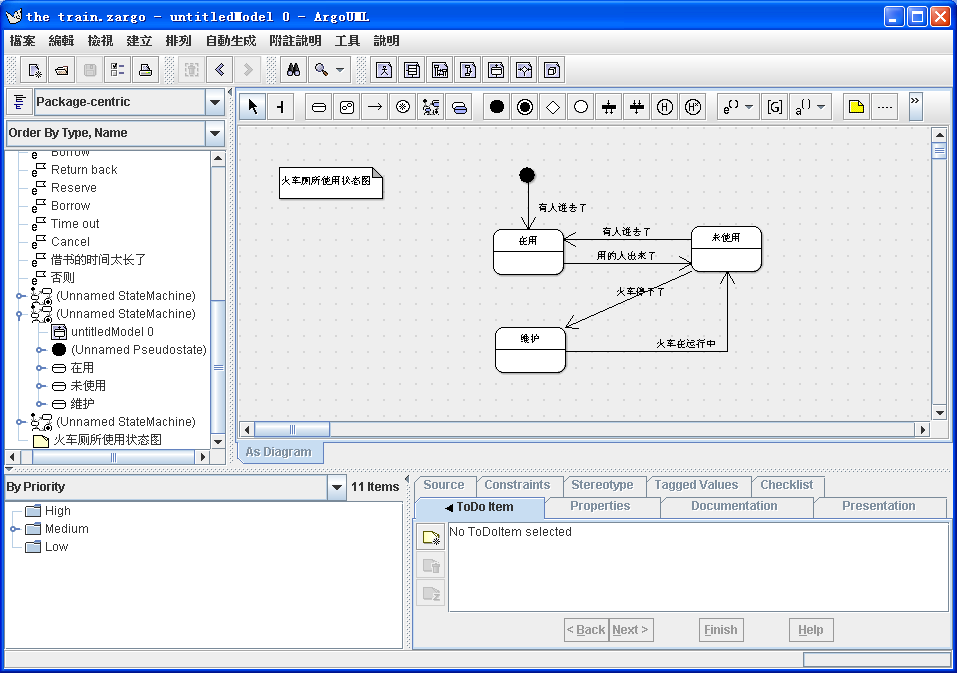
- Initial release: April 1999
- Stable release: 0.35.1
- Written in: Java
- Platform: Java SE
- Type: Software development, UML Tool
- License: Eclipse Public License 1.0
- Website: argouml.org
- Repository: github.com/argouml-tigris-org/argouml

ArgoUML is an UML diagramming application written in Java and released under the open source Eclipse Public License. By virtue of being a Java application, it is available on any platform supported by Java SE.

== History ==
ArgoUML was originally developed at UC Irvine by Jason E. Robbins, leading to his Ph.D. It was an open source project hosted by Tigris.org and moved in 2019 to GitHub. The ArgoUML project included more than 19,000 registered users and over 150 developers.

In 2003, ArgoUML won the Software Development Magazine's annual Readers' Choice Award in the “Design and Analysis Tools” category.

ArgoUML development has suffered from lack of manpower. For example, Undo has been a perpetually requested feature since 2003 but has not been implemented yet.

== Features ==
According to the official feature list, ArgoUML is capable of the following:

- All 9 UML 1.4 diagrams are supported.
- Closely follows the UML standard.
- Platform independent – Java 1.5+ and C++.
- Click and Go! with Java Web Start (no setup required, starts from your web browser).
- Standard UML 1.4 Metamodel.
- XMI support.
- Export diagrams as GIF, PNG, PS, EPS, PGML and SVG.
- Available in ten languages: EN, EN-GB, DE, ES, IT, RU, FR, NB, PT, ZH.
- Advanced diagram editing and zoom.
- Built-in design critics provide unobtrusive review of design and suggestions for improvements.
- Extensible modules interface.
- OCL support.
- Forward engineering (code generation supports C++ and C#, Java, PHP 4, PHP 5, Ruby and, with less mature modules, Ada, Delphi and SQL).
- Reverse engineering / JAR/class file import.

== Weaknesses ==
- ArgoUML does not yet completely implement the UML standard.
- Partial undo feature (working for graphics edits)
- Java Web Start launching may no longer work reliably. See Java Web Start.

== See also ==
- List of UML tools
- MetaCASE tool
