= Visual modeling =

Visual modeling is practice of representing a system graphically. The result, a visual model, can provide an artifact that describes a complex system in a way that can be understood by experts and novices alike. Via visual models, complex ideas are not held to human limitations, allowing for greater complexity without a loss of comprehension. Visual modeling can also be used to bring a group to a consensus. Models help effectively communicate ideas among designers, allowing for quicker discussion and an eventual consensus.

Notable modeling languages include industry open standards such as UML, SysML, Modelica, and proprietary languages, such as those associated with VisSim, MATLAB and Simulink, OPNET, NetSim, NI Multisim, and Reactive Blocks. Both VisSim and Reactive Blocks provide a royalty-free, downloadable viewer that lets anyone open and interactively simulate their models. The community edition of Reactive Blocks also allows full editing of the models as well as compilation, as long as the work is published under the Eclipse Public License.

Visual modeling languages may be general-purpose modeling (GPM), such as UML, Southbeach Notation, IDEF, or domain-specific modeling (DSM) such as SysML. The development of visual modeling languages is an area of active research as evidenced by increasing interest in DSM languages, visual requirements, and visual OWL (Web Ontology Language).

Visual modeling had no standards before the 1990's, and was incomparable until the introduction of the UML.

== See also ==
- Service-oriented modeling
- Model-driven engineering
