= NClass =

- Developer(s): Balazs Tihanyi; Georgi Baychev
- Stable release: 2.7.0 / September 27, 2019; 5 years ago
- Written in: C#
- Operating system: Cross-platform
- Type: UML tool
- License: GPL
- Website: github.com/gbaychev/NClass

NClass is a free and open source software tool to create Unified Modeling Language (UML) class diagrams for C# and Java applications. It is written in C# only and needs the .NET Framework 4.0 or the latest version of Mono.

== Features ==
NClass supports only class diagram of the standard UML diagram types.

The user interface is designed to be simple and user friendly, and the visualization of diagrams is configurable via a style system. NClass can generate source code from the model or reverse engineer .NET assemblies by a plugin written by Malte Ried. It can also export to many image formats like JPEG, Portable Network Graphics (PNG), or Windows Metafile.

== Future development ==
NClass is missing several major features like undo or round-trip engineering which are frequently requested. These features are planned to be implemented in long-term development.
