= MonoUML =

MonoUML is a CASE tool based on the Mono framework. Designed for allowing Unix/Linux developers to design computer systems faster using a friendly GUI application. Not only a diagramming tool but rather a complete CASE tool based on the OMG standards and fully compatible with proprietary tools. MonoUML supports reverse engineering of executables (.exe) or .NET assemblies.

== See also ==
- List of UML tools
