= Astah* =

UML and SysML modeling software

Astah
- Developers: Change Vision, Inc.
- Stable release: 12.0 / July 15, 2026; 3 months ago
- Written in: Java
- Operating system: Windows, macOS, Linux (Note: Linux is supported by Astah Professional and Astah UML. Astah SysML and Astah System Safety run on Windows and macOS only.)
- Type: UML tool, SysML tool
- License: Proprietary
- Website: astah.net

Astah, formerly known as JUDE (Java and UML Developers' Environment, pronounced Jūdo (ジュード)), is a UML modeling tool created by Japanese company Change Vision. JUDE received the "Software Product Of The Year 2006" prize, established by Information-Technology Promotion Agency in Japan.

== Versions ==
=== JUDE/Community ===
The Community edition (formerly known as Take (竹, "Bamboo") edition for prior to version 1.4) was distributed free of charge until it was discontinued on 26 September 2018. It offered the following functionality:

- Support of UML 1.4 (part of UML 2.0 expression in commercial version JUDE/Professional)
- Class diagram (Object, Package, Subsystem and Robustness Diagrams are included)
- Use case diagram
- Sequence diagram
- Collaboration Diagram
- State diagram
- Activity diagram
- Deployment diagram
- Component diagram
- Generate Java 1.4 sourcecode from model
- Import Java 1.4 source files to create model

Change Vision offers a free license of Astah UML to students at accredited colleges and universities for personal use, a free viewer, Astah Viewer, for files created with Astah Professional and Astah UML, and time-limited trial versions of its paid editions (20 days; 40 days for Astah System Safety).

=== JUDE/Professional ===
JUDE/Professional is the product version of JUDE with all the features of JUDE/Community plus enhancements. It has features such as input-output and diagram creation guidance. It is suitable for business use, large-sized models, and document creation.

- Merge JUDE Projects
- UseCase Descriptions
- UseCase Description Templates
- Process Diagram
- Model Input-Output function from/to XML
- Mindmaps
- ER diagram

JUDE/Professional began to support the part of diagrams' expressions of UML2.0 from version 3.0.

- Frame
- Navigable Association (Class Diagram, UseCase Diagram, Deployment Diagram)
- Required Interface (Class Diagram) (from version 3.1)
- Provided Interface (Class Diagram)
- CombinedFragment (Sequence Diagram)
- InteractionUse (Sequence Diagram)
- FoundMessage (Sequence Diagram)
- LostMessage (Sequence Diagram)
- StateInvariant (Sequence Diagram)
- Vertical and Horizontal Partitions (Activity Diagram)
- Component Diagram (from version 3.1)
- Composite Structure Diagram (from version 3.1)

JUDE/Professional supports also ER diagram from version 3.2.

== History ==
JUDE development was started by Kenji Hiranabe, a co-founder and the CTO of Change Vision, Inc., in 1996.

JUDE was provided as a free software in 1999. Five years later JUDE started selling in the Japanese market. This decision came about because some UML modeling tools existed overseas but they were a bit high priced; and the company would get feedback from Japanese users and could evolve more if JUDE was released on the market.

The number of JUDE users was 120,000 as of October 30, 2006. In September 2009, JUDE was renamed to Astah after receiving concerns from German users who pointed out the product name was similar to the German word Jude, which refers to a male Jew.

== See also ==
- UML
- List of UML tools
- List of SysML tools
