= UML Designer =

- Developer(s): Obeo
- Stable release: 9.0
- Written in: Java, Sirius
- Platform: Linux, Mac OS X, Microsoft Windows
- Type: UML tool
- License: Eclipse Public License
- Website: http://www.umldesigner.org/

UML Designer is an open-source UML tool based on Sirius and Eclipse. The project is licensed under the EPL.

== UML2 ==
UML Designer is a graphical modeling tool for UML2 based on the Eclipse UML2 plugin and as defined by OMG. It provides support for the main UML diagrams and for UML profiles.

== Domain specific approach ==
As it is based on Sirius, the UML models could be combined with Domain Specific Modeling. Each diagram definition could be extended and adapted to specific user needs or combine it to Domain Specific Languages.

== Releases ==
- First stable release: UML Designer 1.0 available since 2012
- Latest stable release: UML Designer 9.0 available since 30 January 2019

Legend:
Previous versions	Latest stable release	Next release

Version	Release date
1.0.0	2012
2.0.0	17 January 2013
2.1.0	1 February 2013
2.2.0	12 April 2013
2.3.0	13 June 2013
2.4.0	13 September 2013
3.0.0	17 January 2014
4.0.0	8 July 2014
4.0.1	5 August 2014
5.0.0	29 May 2015
6.0.0	19 October 2015
7.0.0	3 August 2016
8.0.0	18 September 2017
8.1.0	26 July 2018
9.0.0	30 January 2019

== Compatibility ==
The latest release of UML Designer is compatible with the following version of Eclipse:

- Eclipse Oxygen

UML Designer is based on the UML2 Eclipse plugin. Thus it is compatible with any tool that can produce UML2 compatible models.

Modules are available through the Eclipse Marketplace to combine it with SysML or to directly generate code (Java or C).

== Community and communication ==
The UML Designer community is gathered around the UML Designer website and the documentation is accessible online.
