= Give Me My Data =

Web application for Facebook users

Give Me My Data was a web application for Facebook users to export their Facebook data to reuse in data visualization, archives, or digital storytelling. Export data formats include comma-separated values (CSV), Extensible Markup Language (XML), and JavaScript Object Notation (JSON) and graph drawing formats used in Graphviz and similar applications.

Owen Mundy launched the application in November 2009. In May 2010, The New York Times and other technology-oriented news outlets covered its use by Facebook subscribers to retrieve data lost during a Facebook interface update. It has since received international coverage for its technology and as Internet art. The application was discontinued in 2015 after being blocked by Facebook.

== See also ==
- Open data
