= Software Ideas Modeler =

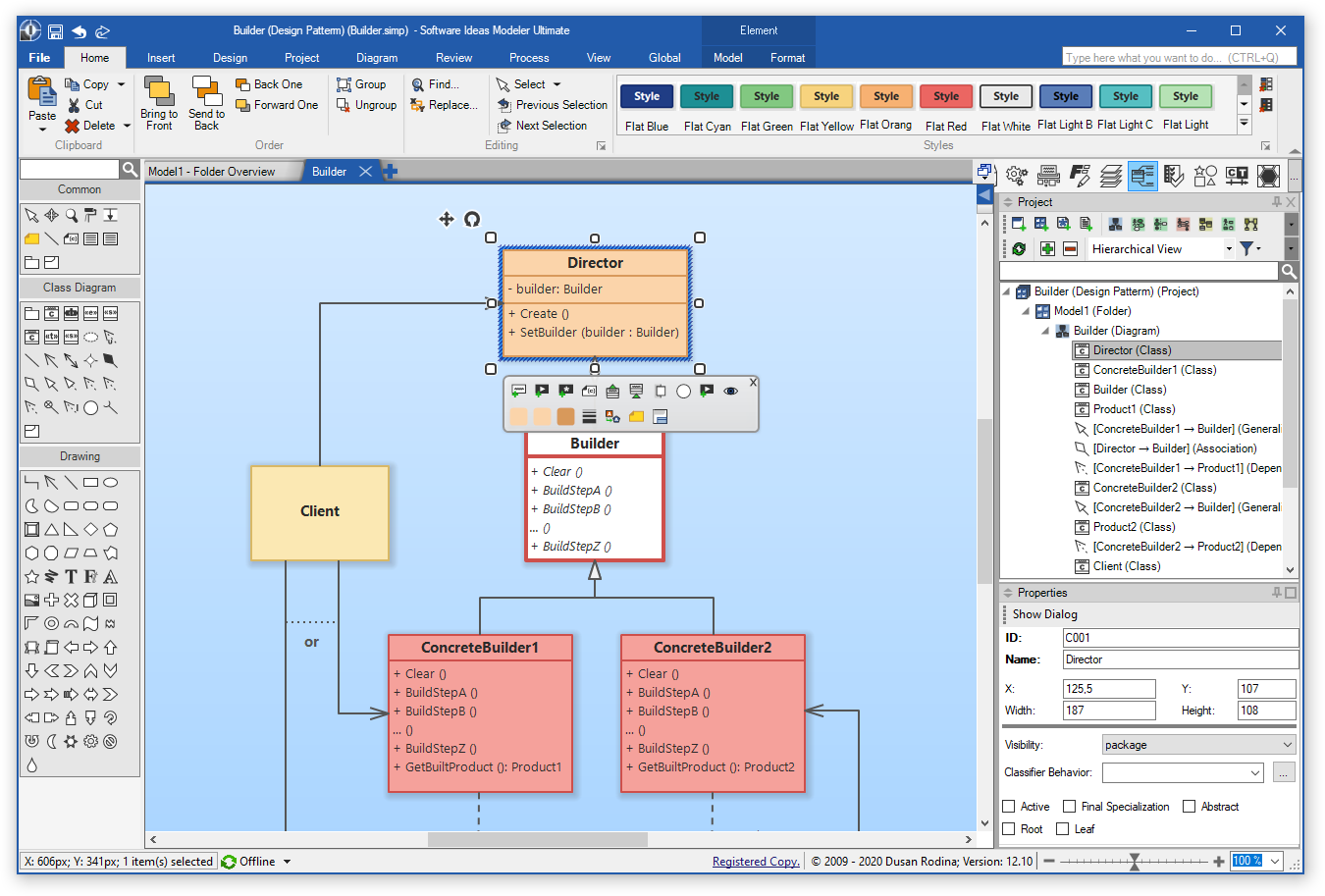
- Developer: Dusan Rodina
- Stable release: 14.50 / May 28, 2024
- Operating system: Microsoft Windows, Linux
- Type: UML tool
- License: Freeware for non-commercial use
- Website: www.softwareideas.net

Software Ideas Modeler is a CASE and an UML tool. The modeler supports all 14 diagram types specified in UML 2.5. It also supports among others the following diagrams and standards:

- ER diagrams
- BPMN 2.0
- CMMN
- SysML 1.5
- ArchiMate 3
- JSD
- CRC
- flowcharts
- data flow diagram
- Infographics
- Wireframes
- Mind maps
- User Stories
- Roadmaps
- ORM (Object-role_modeling)
- Decision Model and Notation
- Gantt chart
- Nassi–Shneiderman diagram
- C4 model
- Feature_model

Software Ideas Modeler is the work of Slovak software developer Dušan Rodina. The software is written in C#.

== Exports ==
There is an export to raster image formats (BMP, GIF, JPG, PNG, TIFF), vector image formats (Windows Metafile, SVG) and PDF.

There is also export to XMI.

== Imports ==
There is an import from XMI.

== Supported programming languages ==
There is an export to:

- ActionScript
- C#
- C++
- Dart
- Object Pascal (Delphi)
- Java
- JavaScript
- JSON
- JSON Schema
- PHP
- Protobuf
- Python
- Ruby
- Rust
- SQL
- TypeScript
- Visual Basic
- Visual Basic .NET
- XML Schema

There is an import from:

- C#
- C++
- Dart
- Java
- JavaScript
- Object Pascal (Delphi)
- PHP
- Python
- Ruby
- Rust
- SQL
- TypeScript
- Visual Basic .NET

== See also ==
- List of UML tools
