= UModel =

Altova UModel
- Software modeling with UModel
- Developer: Altova
- Stable release: 2026 / October 21, 2025
- Operating system: Microsoft Windows
- Type: UML Tool
- Website: www.altova.com/umodel

UModel is a UML (Unified Modeling Language) software modeling tool from Altova, the creator of XMLSpy. UModel supports all 14 UML 2 diagram types and adds a unique diagram for modeling XML Schemas in UML. UModel also supports SysML for embedded system developers, and business process modeling (BPMN notation) for enterprise analysts. UModel includes code engineering functionality including code generation in Java (programming language), C#, and Visual Basic, reverse engineering of existing applications, and round-trip engineering.

UModel supports model interchange with other UML tools through the XMI standard, integrates with revision control systems, and operates as a plug-in for Eclipse and Visual Studio integrated development environments (IDE).

UModel was introduced in 2005, shortly after the ratification of the UML 2 standard.

== Developer reviews ==
While UModel supports the UML, SysML, and BPMN modeling languages, it does not promote a particular methodology for the modeling, software development, code generation, or round trip engineering processes. “This gives UModel the ability to allow you the maximum flexibility during these creative processes,” said one software developer in a review of UModel 2010.

== Licensing ==
UModel is a licensed software product that uses key protection to prevent unlicensed usage.

== See also ==
- Comparison of UML Tools
