= BOUML =

Open source UML diagram software

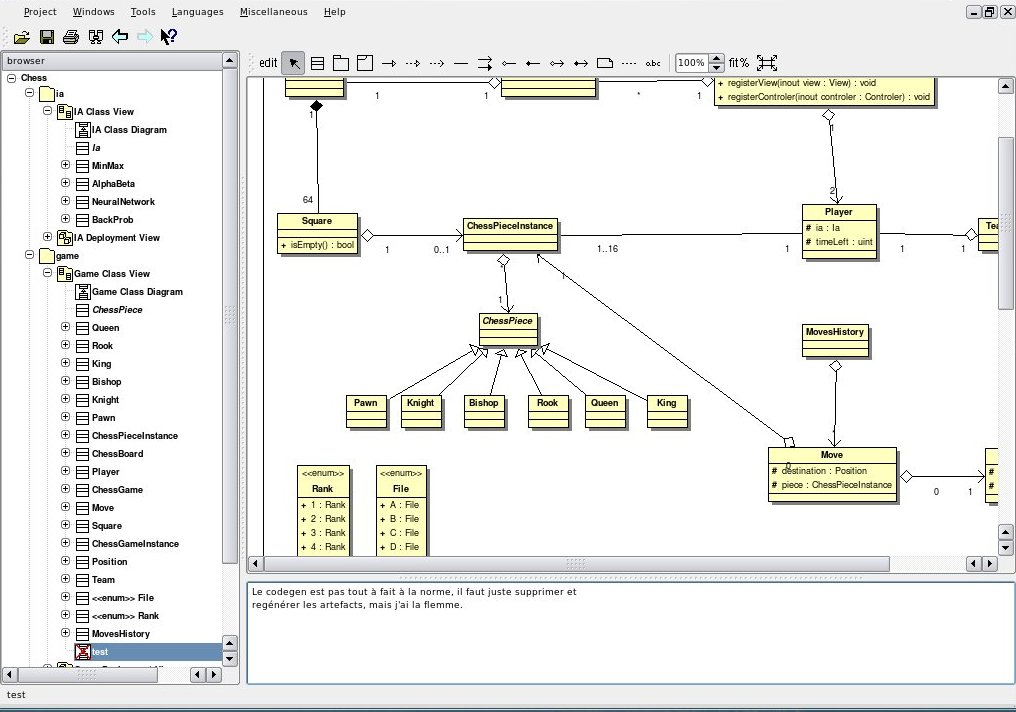
- Developer: Bruno Pagès
- Stable release: 7.11 patch 3 / March 25, 2025; 9 months ago
- Written in: C++
- Operating system: Cross-platform
- Available in: Multilingual
- Type: Unified Modeling Language tool box
- License: Proprietary starting from v5.0 up to v6.12, free of use from v7.0
- Website: www.bouml.fr

BOUML is a Unified Modeling Language (UML) diagram designer. Programmed in C++ and Qt, it is multilingual, and supports code generation and code reverse engineering. The releases prior to version 4.23 are free software licensed under the GNU General Public License (GPL). BOUML 5 up to 6.12 is proprietary software. BOUML 7 and later is free software.

== History ==
In September 2010, developer Bruno Pagès announced that he was ceasing work on BOUML (other than bug fixes), citing "copyright violations and mismanagement from Wikipedia administrators".

The version 4.23 named "ultimate" was distributed in November 2010, after which it was announced that no more updates would be released. However, several patches were released after the announcement, the last being BOUML 4.23 ultimate patch 7 in October 2011.

In February 2012, version 5 was released as the first paid version. It has a new file format, but is backward compatible in that version 5 can read project files saved by the old versions.

In August 2012, version 6 was released as the first version managing MySQL.

In May 2017, BOUML is again free of use and the version 7 was released as the first of the new free versions, it is still backward compatible in that version 7 can read project files saved by the old versions.

In August 2021, developer Bruno Pagès announced the end of the development of BOUML due to obsolescence of the used framework.

== Code generation and reverse engineering ==
BOUML can automatically generate code from the UML class diagrams and rebuild them from existing source code using the following languages: C++, Java, PHP, and MySQL. It can also generate code for Python and IDL, but not extract the UML model for these languages.

== See also ==
- List of Unified Modeling Language tools
