= Papyrus (software) =

UML2 graphical editing tool based on Eclipse

- Developers: Commissariat à l'Énergie Atomique (CEA-List), Atos, Cedric Dumoulin (LIFL)
- Stable release: 6.7.0 / June 2024; 1 year ago
- Written in: Java
- Operating system: Windows, Linux, macOS
- Available in: English
- Type: UML tool
- License: EPL
- Website: eclipse.dev/papyrus/
- Repository: gitlab.eclipse.org/eclipse/papyrus/org.eclipse.papyrus-desktop/

Papyrus is an open-source UML 2 tool based on Eclipse and licensed under the EPL. It has been developed by the Laboratory of Model Driven Engineering for Embedded Systems (LISE) which is a part of the French Alternative Energies and Atomic Energy Commission (CEA-List).

Papyrus can either be used as a standalone tool or as an Eclipse plugin. It provides support for domain-specific languages and SysML. Papyrus is designed to be easily extensible as it is based on the principle of UML Profiles.

== UML2 ==
Papyrus is a graphical editing tool for UML2 as defined by OMG. Papyrus provides support for UML profiles. Every part of Papyrus may be customized: model explorer, diagram editors, property editors, etc.

== SysML ==
Papyrus also provides a complete support to SysML in order to enable model-based system engineering. It includes an implementation of the SysML static profile and the specific graphical editors required for SysML.

== UML-RT ==
A variant of Papyrus, Papyrus for Real Time (Papyrus-RT), implements UML-RT, a domain-specific language (DSL) designed for real-time embedded systems development. UML-RT is a UML-based variant of Real-Time Object-Oriented Modeling (ROOM).
