= Capella (engineering) =

Software environment for model-based systems engineering

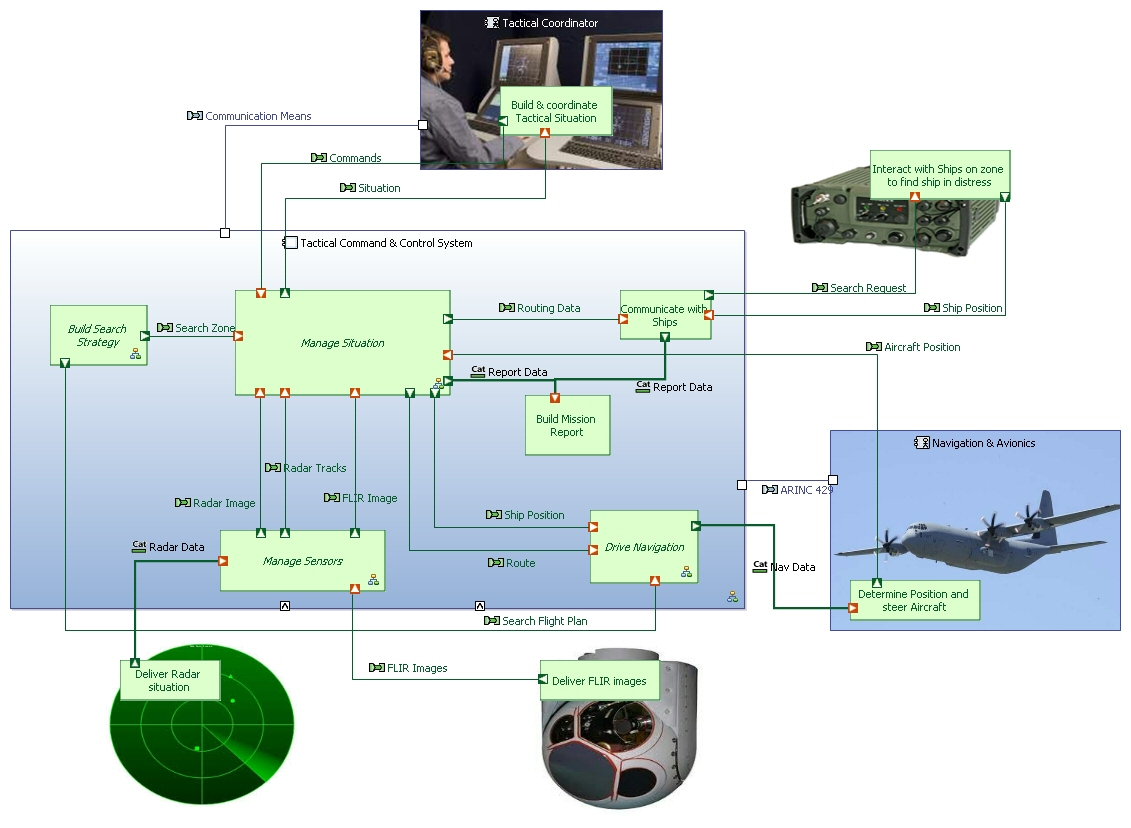
- Developer: PolarSys Industry Working Group of the Eclipse Foundation
- Stable release: 7.1.1
- Written in: Java
- Platform: Linux, Mac OS X, Microsoft Windows
- Type: Model Driven Architecture
- License: Eclipse Public License
- Website: mbse-capella.org
- Repository: github.com/eclipse/capella.git

Capella is an open-source solution for model-based systems engineering (MBSE). Hosted at polarsys.org, this solution provides a process and tooling for graphical modeling of systems, hardware or software architectures, in accordance with the principles and recommendations defined by the Arcadia method. Capella is an initiative of PolarSys, one of several Eclipse Foundation working groups.

== Usage ==
Capella is mainly used for modeling complex and safety-critical systems in embedded systems development for industries such as aerospace, avionics, transportation, space, communications and security and automotive.

== History ==
Capella was created by Thales in 2007, and has been under continuous development and evolution since then. The objective is to contribute to the transformation of engineering, providing an engineering environment which approach is based on models rather than focused on documents, piloted by a process, and offering, by construction, ways to ensure effective co-engineering. Operational experts from engineering then defined a unified language for modeling architectures in the group and specified the associated tooling, Capella.

Capella provides ergonomics that are similar to PowerPoint / Visio and Excel tools. Hence, the resulting environment is actually intuitive and allows engineers to focus on defining their architectures instead of learning and operating complex generic modeling languages, such as UML or SysML, to capture their design requirements. Because it is based on the Arcadia method, it also guides engineers in their activities, which generic modeling tools in general, do not do. In 2015, Capella was released as an Eclipse open source project by PolarSys, a Working Group of the Eclipse Foundation through the French collaborative project Clarity, supported by the Banque Publique d’Investissement (Bpifrance). Capella has its own life cycle. A major release, providing new functionality is delivered each year end while several versions called minor, including bugs fixes, are generally delivered over the course of the year.

== Principles ==
Capella comes with its own metamodel, which defines the language concepts the user can enable in a Capella project. The user creates an instance of this metamodel and can then view the model from various perspectives through diagrams, according to his/her concerns. The user can also, via the palette associated with diagrams, create new model elements. A Capella project consists of a model part ("melodymodeller") and a graphic part ("aird").

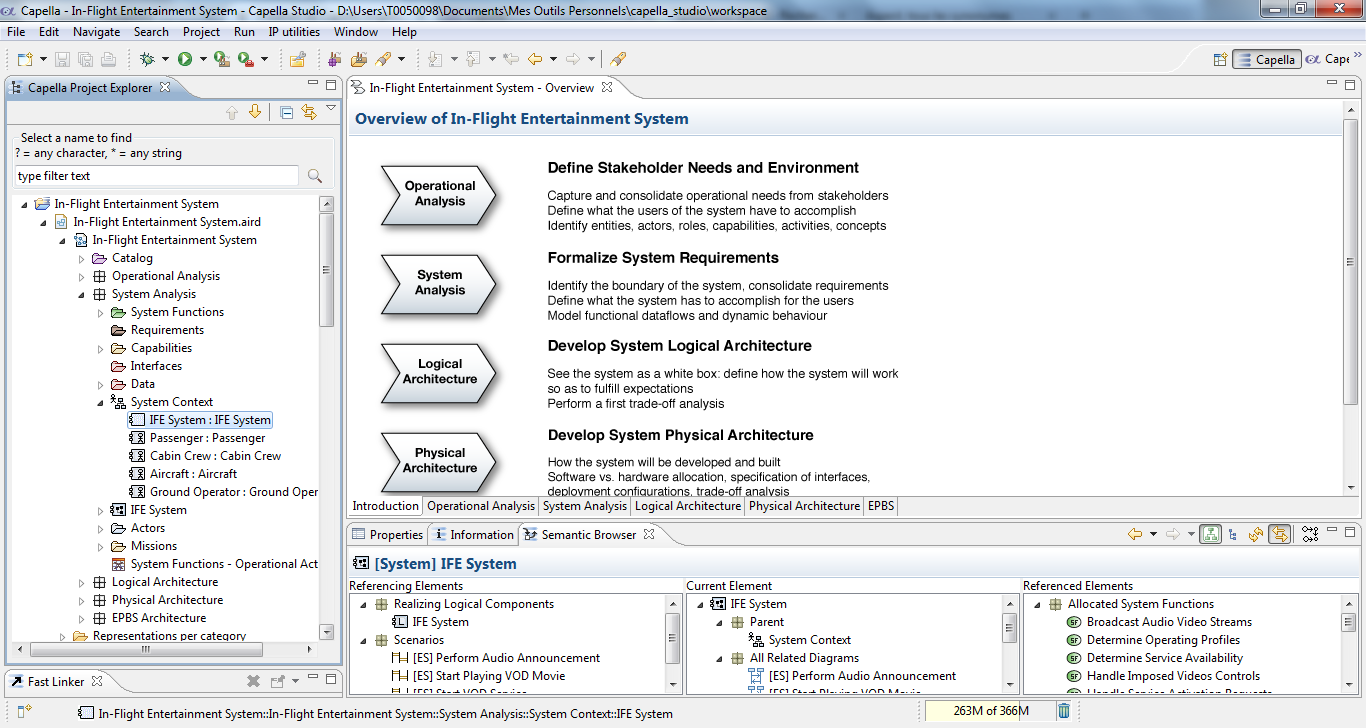
Workbench GUI

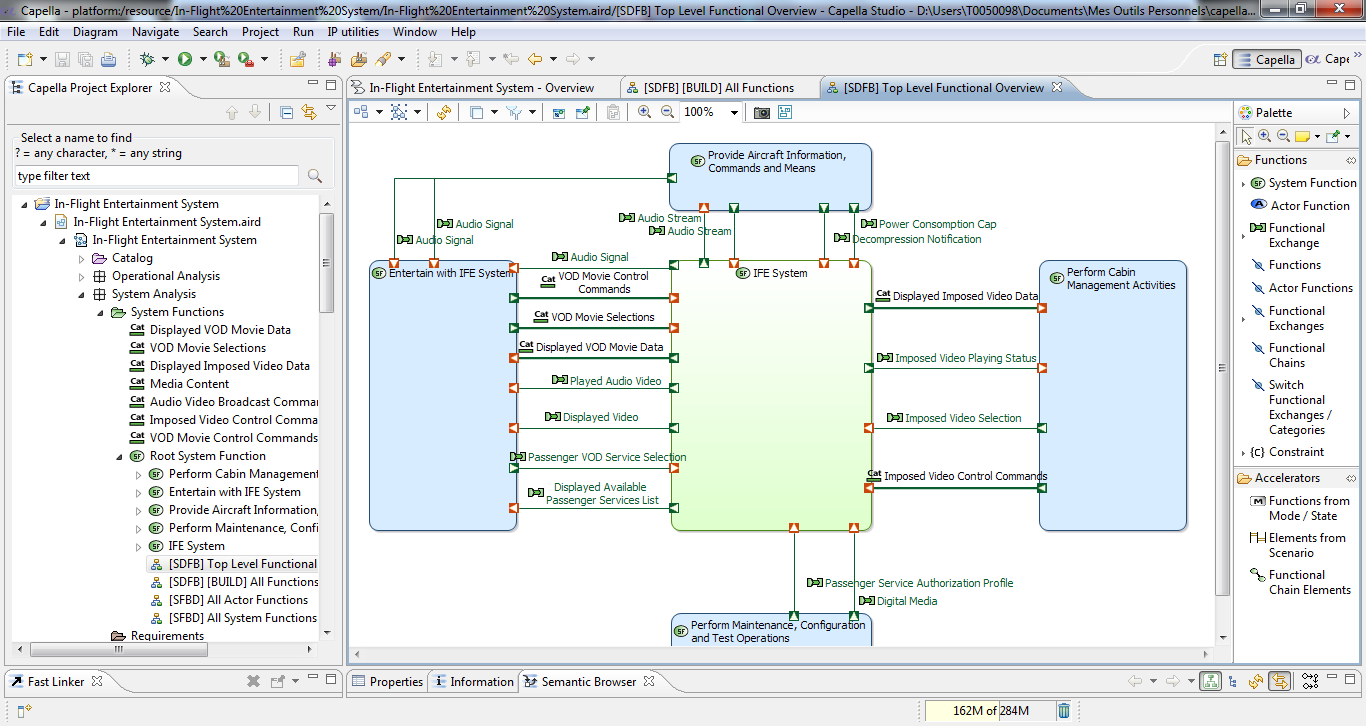
Diagrams with set of tools

When a Capella project is created, the workbench interface is presented to the user. It contains various areas:

- The "methodological browser" area, shows the user the various engineering phases for architecture modeling and shortcuts to create new diagrams within the given engineering phase; this view also facilitates the "transition" between engineering phases, so as to create links between phases and associated elements;
- The "semantic browser" area provides tools for navigating into the model: for each selected item in the "project" area or on a diagram, the semantic browser area will present the user all references for that element, that is, its capacity or reference relationships and all diagrams in which the element is involved;
- The "project" area is a more traditional view; it is a tree view of the Capella model, and contains all the semantic elements and diagrams created by the user;
- The "diagram" area presents a graphical view of an extract of the model and allows the user to edit the model. The user can create, modify or delete elements and can also change the organization or appearance of elements in the diagram;
- The "properties" area displays all the properties of a selected element in the model or in a diagram.

== Diagrams ==
Through Capella, the user can handle several types of diagrams. The representation of elements in diagrams is governed by a color code specific to each type of analysis. Some examples of diagrams:

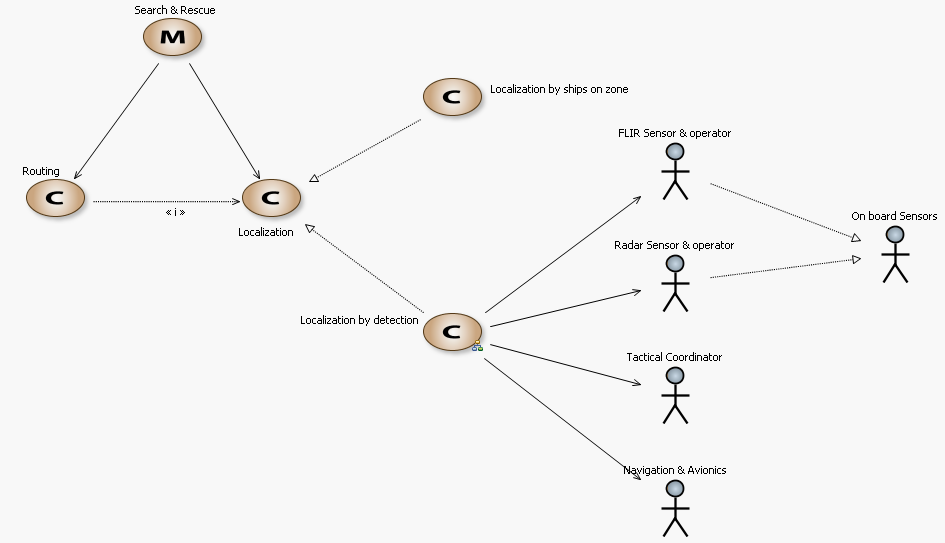
Operational Capabilities

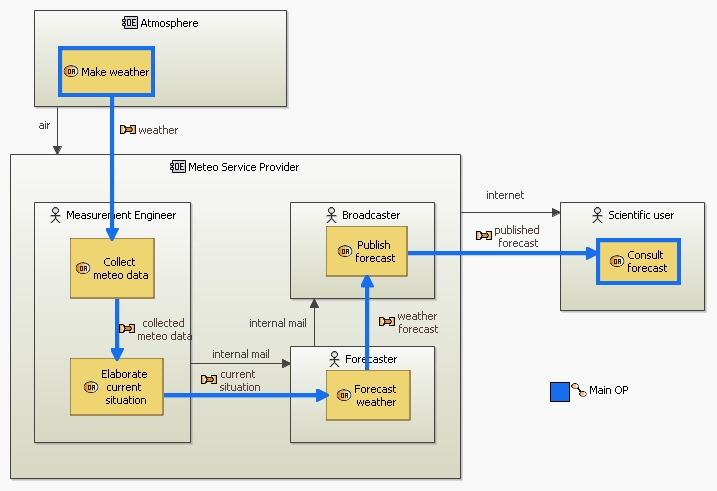
Operational Architecture

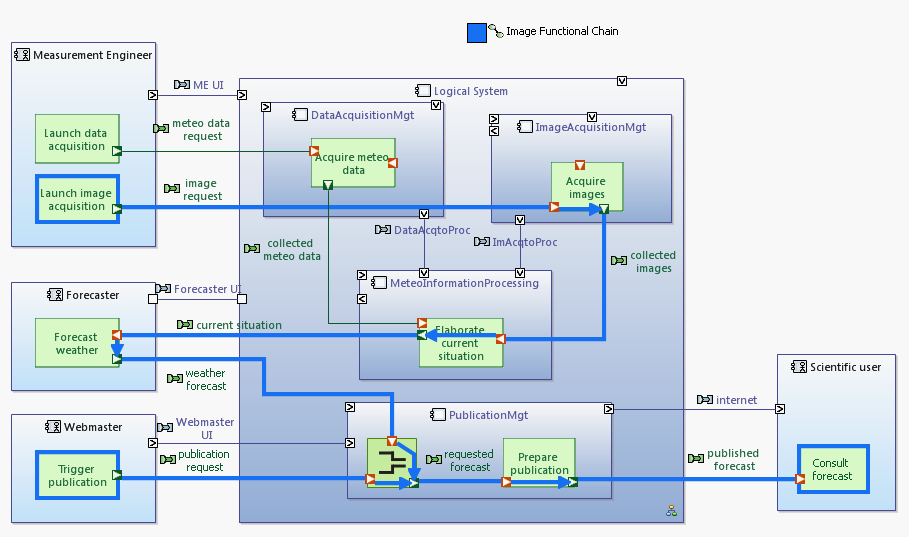
Logical Architecture

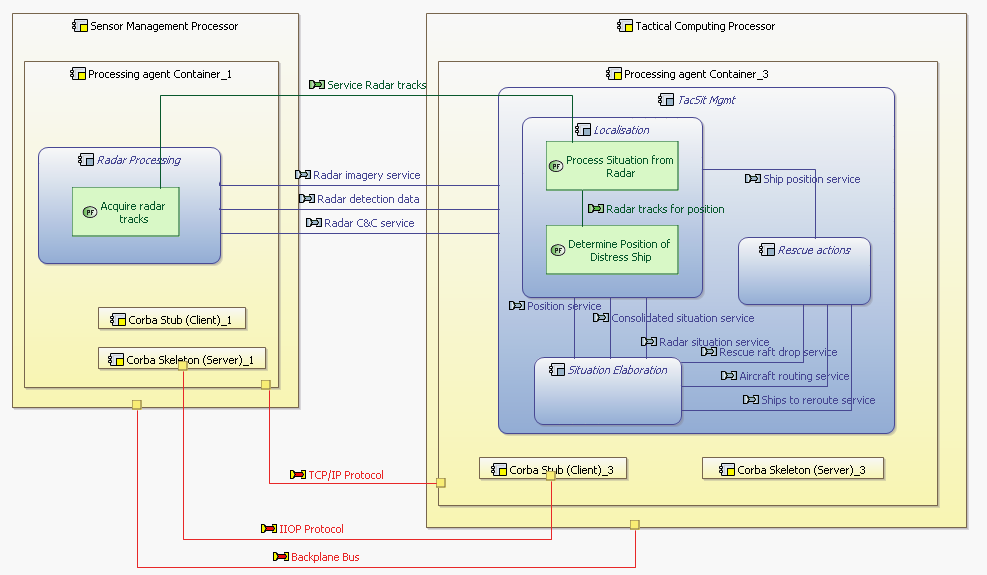
Physical Architecture

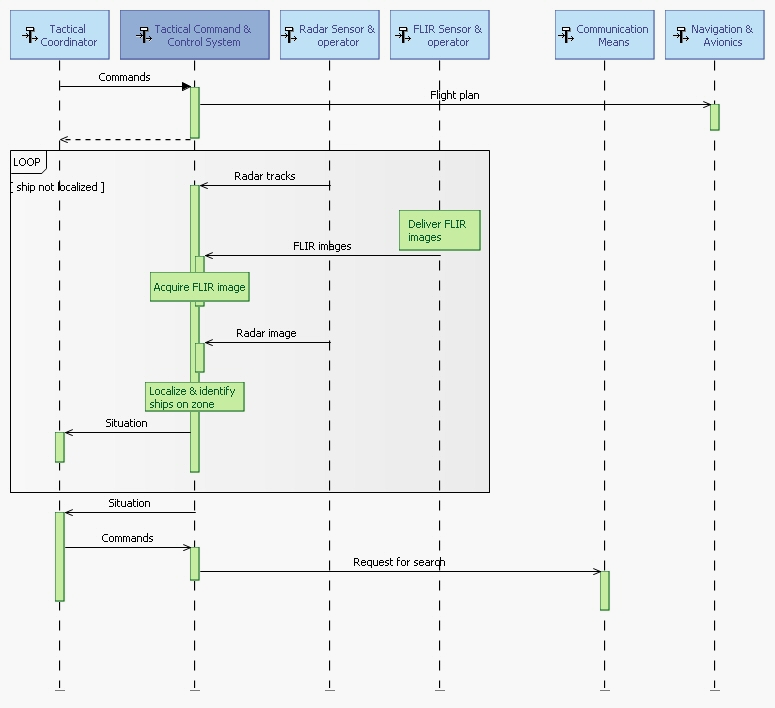
Functional Scenario

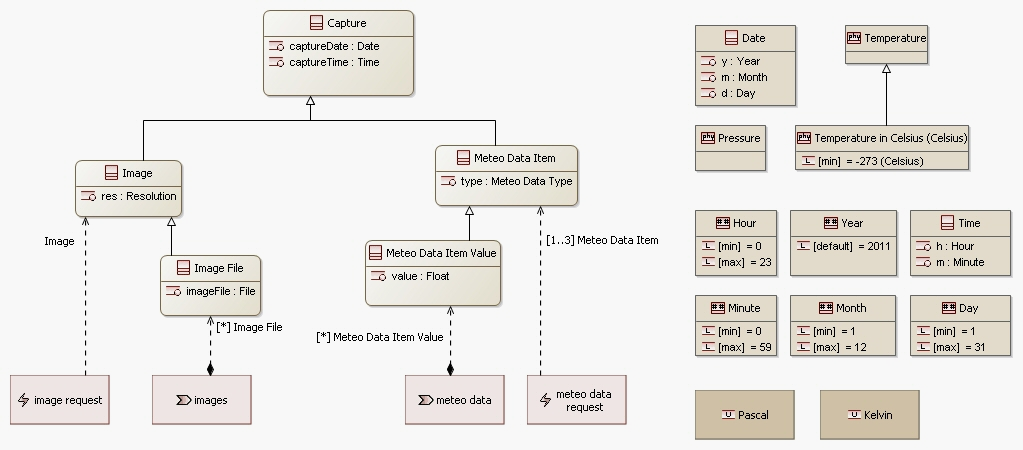
Class Diagram

== Extensibility ==
The workbench can be enhanced or specialized for a given business need, according to the concept of "Point of View", defined by the standard ISO/IEC 42010. These extensions provide, for example:

- The ability to manage new information specific to a particular engineering need with its associated tooling. For example, non-functional properties such as time constraints for performance analysis, or constraints related to safety or security, cost of component for cost analysis, mass, etc.;
- The ability to specify the engineering approach with various architectural styles;
- The ability to add new features to the workbench, such as a documentation export or a specialization of the transition system / subsystem mechanism.

== Compatibility ==
Capella is supported on environments based on Java 7 and higher on the following platforms:

- Linux
- Mac OS X
- Windows XP, Windows Vista, Windows 7

== Dependencies ==
The latest version of Capella is based on:

- Sirius
- Eclipse
- Kitalpha: an open source solution of the PolarSys industry working group of the Eclipse Foundation
- Eclipse EMF Diff / Merge

== Community and communication ==
Links to the community and more information are available on the PolarSys website. Capella documentation is available for download from the website.

Capella was presented at several events:

| Conference | Title | Date | Place |
|---|---|---|---|
| SiriusCon 2016 | Collaborative modeling with Capella and Sirius | 15/11/2016 | Paris |
| Incose 2016 | Simplifying (and enriching) SysML to perform functional analysis and model instances | 18/06/2016 | Edinburgh |
| EclipseCon France | Hands-On Systems Modeling with ARCADIA / Capella | 07/06/2016 | Toulouse |
| Dutch Eclipse Day | Model-based engineering with Capella: Status and perspectives | 18/04/2016 | Eindhoven |
| EclipseCon North America | Mars exploration guided by PolarSys | 07/03/2016 | Reston |
| ERTS | MBSE with ARCADIA Method and Capella Tool | 27/01/2016 | Toulouse |
| MODELS | CLARITY: Open-Sourcing the Model-Based Systems Engineering Solution Capella | 29/09/2015 | Ottawa |
| SPLC | Tooling Support for Variability and Architectural Patterns in Systems Engineering | 23/07/2015 | Nashville |
| MODELS | CLARITY: Open-Sourcing the Model-Based Systems Engineering Solution Capella | 29/09/2015 | Ottawa |
| INCOSE International Symposium | Implementing the MBSE Cultural Change: Organization, Coaching and Lessons Learned | 14/07/2015 | Seattle |
| INCOSE International Symposium | From initial investigations up to large-scale rollout of an MBSE method and its supporting workbench: the Thales experience | 14/07/2015 | Seattle |
| EclipseCon France | Capella time-lapse: A system architecture model in 30 minutes | 25/06/2015 | Toulouse |
| EclipseCon France | Systems Modeling with the ARCADIA method and the Capella tool | 24/06/2015 | Toulouse |
| Nouvelle France Industrielle | Presentation of Clarity and Capella to Emmanuel Macron | 18/05/2015 | École des Mines of Nantes |
| EclipseCon North America | Capella time-lapse: A system architecture model in 30 minutes | 12/03/2015 | San Francisco |
| EclipseCon Europe | Capella on the field: Model-based system engineering use cases | 29/10/2014 | Ludwigsburg |
| Model-Based System Engineering (MBSE) Symposium | The Challenges of Deploying MBSE Solutions | 28/10/2014 | Canberra |
| Model-Based System Engineering (MBSE) Symposium | Arcadia and Capella in the Field | 27/10/2014 | Canberra |
| EclipseCon France | Arcadia / Capella, a field-proven modeling solution for system and software architecture engineering | 19/06/2014 | Toulouse |
| EclipseCon North America | Arcadia / Capella, a field-proven modeling solution for system and software architecture engineering | 20/03/2015 | San Francisco |
| Complex Systems Design & Management (CSDM) | Model-Based Collaboration for System, Software and Hardware Engineering | 04/12/2013 | Paris |

== See also ==
- Metamodeling
- Model-driven engineering
