= Together (software) =

Software development tool

- Developers: Peter Coad, Object International Software GmbH, TogetherSoft LLC, Borland, Micro Focus, OpenText
- Release: 1998
- Final release: 14.0.0 / 31 October 2021; 4 years ago
- Written in: Java
- Operating system: Cross-platform
- Included with: JBuilder
- Type: UML tool, CASE, IDE
- License: Proprietary
- Website: web.archive.org/web/20211116055439/https://www.microfocus.com/en-us/products/together/overview

Together is a discontinued CASE and UML modeling product currently owned by OpenText, formerly by Micro Focus (acquired by OpenText in 2023), formerly by Borland (acquired by Micro Focus in 2009), formerly developed by TogetherSoft LLC / Object International Software GmbH, originally developed under lead of Peter Coad who owned both TogetherSoft and Object International.

== Awards and mentions ==
The Together/J (presumably version 1) was shown and mentioned by Java creator James Gosling at conference JavaOne'98 as "a 100% pure Java app and it runs on whatever you want. And it's a really cool design".

In December 1998 the Together/J Suite (version 2) was called "Best Commercial Java App" by JavaWorld.com based on opinion by judges at Java Business Expo.

The analyst group ComputerWire named Together as one of its "Top-10 Object Apps" in 1999.

Together Enterprise 3.2 wins "Most Innovative Java Product" in JavaPro Magazine's Reader's Choice Awards.

The 4th version of the product was voted "Best Java Application" in the Java Developer's Journal Readers' Choice Awards (August 15, 2000 issue of the Java Developer's Journal), an awards ceremony happened at JavaCon 2000 in Santa Clara, CA on September 25, 2000. Together/J was also recognized in the categories for "Best Java Modeling Tool" and "Most Innovative Java Product". The Together Control Center 4.0 has been voted best product in the Integrated Development Environment Category by developers attending the Application Development 2000 Conference.

Together ControlCenter 6.0 became the winner of the Java Pro 2002 Readers’ Choice Award. The fourth annual awards program, sponsored by Java Pro Magazine, was based on a survey of the magazine's readership, which consisted of enterprise-level Java developers. TogetherSoft's product was recognized for its strength as “Best Modeling Tool for Java.”

== History of development ==
German company Object International Software GmbH, founded in 1994, has developed and released a CASE tool Together around 1997, it was referenced in a 1997' book by Peter Coad "Java design: building better apps and applets" and a copy of the Together/J Whiteboard Edition was included in an attached CD to a second edition (1999) of the book. The product received several awards, and in 1999 a separate American company TogetherSoft LLC was created. At the time there were 3 companies, a head company TogetherSoft Corporation, one American branch and TogetherSoft GmbH in Germany to operate in Europe. Earlier versions of the Together products were completely proprietary self-contained applications written in Java.

in November 2001 Borland and TogetherSoft formed a partnership called Board of Stewards, and Together was rewritten as a plugin for Eclipse which was released in late 2002.

In October 2002 it was announced that TogetherSoft will be sold to Borland Group for approximately $210 million, which happened in 2003. In February 2003 Borland officials announced that a Borland Together Edition for JBuilder will be launched to be a part of Borland Enterprise Studio 5 for Java, and will replace Rational Rose.

The development centres of TogetherSoft since middle of 1990s were located in Saint-Petersburg and (after 1998) in Prague, and after 2003 they were mainly responsible for further development and integration of Together with JBuilder. Borland bought both facilities in Prague and in Saint-Petersburg and promised to add 80 sales staff to approximately 250 sales people and sales engineers. Later several developers from ex-TogetherSoft founded a company JetBrains.

As a result of the acquisition, in January 2003 TogetherSoft' CEO/president Peter Coad became senior vice president and chief strategist but he left Borland before the end of 2003 and turned his attention to interests outside of the software development field.

Early versions of TogetherSoft Together were called Together/J, it survived at least to version 3 (referred also as TJ3) in 2000 and supported MS Windows 2000 and RedHat Linux 6.0 with Sun JDK 1.2. Reviewers were noticing a TJ3's unique model-code synchronisation capability and support for Java, C++, and Objective Cobol.

After acquisition of Borland at least from version 6.0.1 the option based on Eclipse appeared (a Together Eclipse Edition). The installation allows installing Together using an existing Eclipse installation. Under Borland' rule the product line was sold in three levels of functionality: Together Developer, Together Designer, and Together Architect; however, since 2007, Together has been unified into a single product.

Free (trial) versions 2.1 and 2.2 of the product were distributed by TogetherSoft in 1998 as Together/J and Together/C++ 2.1, they were called Whiteboard Edition.

In 2004 Borland also distributed a Together Designer Community Edition for free

Name / Version	Developer / owner company at the moment of release	Release date	UML ver.	Based on platform
Together/J	Object International Software GmbH	1998		Java 1.x
Together/J 2.0: Whiteboard, Standard, Developer, and Enterprise edition	Object International Software GmbH Object International, Inc. (USA)	1998, Jul. 6		Java 1.1
Together 2.1: Together/J 2.1 (Whiteboard or Developer edition); Together/C++ 2.1 (Whiteboard or Developer edition); Together/Enterprise (Java, C++) 2.1	Object International Software GmbH Object International, Inc. (USA)	1998, Aug. 25		Java 1.1
Together 2.2: Together/J 2.2 (Whiteboard or Developer edition); Together/C++ 2.2 (Whiteboard or Developer edition); Together/Enterprise (Java, C++) 2.2	Object International Software GmbH Object International, Inc. (USA)	1998, Nov. 30	1.2	Java 1.2
Together/J 3 or TJ3	TogetherSoft Corporation TogetherSoft LLC TogetherSoft GmbH TogetherSoft UK Ltd.	end of 1999		MS Java 1.x
Together/J 3.2	TogetherSoft Corporation TogetherSoft LLC TogetherSoft GmbH TogetherSoft UK Ltd.	2000, Mar. 15		
Together 4.0: Together Control Center 4.0; Together Enterprise 4.0; Together Solo 4.0 (C++, Java); Together 4.0 Whiteboard Edition	TogetherSoft Corporation TogetherSoft LLC TogetherSoft GmbH TogetherSoft UK Ltd.	2000, Jun.	1.3	
Together 4.1	TogetherSoft Corporation TogetherSoft LLC TogetherSoft GmbH TogetherSoft UK Ltd.	2000, Aug.		
Together 4.2: Together Control Center 4.2	TogetherSoft Corporation TogetherSoft LLC TogetherSoft GmbH TogetherSoft UK Ltd.	2000, Nov. 24		
Together 5.0	TogetherSoft Corporation TogetherSoft LLC TogetherSoft GmbH TogetherSoft UK Ltd.			
Together Control Center 5.5: Together Community Edition 5.5 (free replacement for Whiteboard Ed.)	TogetherSoft Corporation TogetherSoft LLC TogetherSoft GmbH TogetherSoft UK Ltd.	2001, Sep.		
Together Control Center 6.0	TogetherSoft Corporation TogetherSoft LLC TogetherSoft GmbH TogetherSoft UK Ltd.	2002, Apr. 1		
Borland Together Control Center 6.0.1: Borland Together for JBuilder 6.0; Borland Together for WebSphere Studio 6.0.1	Borland	2003		JBuilder WebSphere
Borland Together 2005: Together 2005 for Visual Studio .NET: Designer edition (UML 2.0); Developer edition (UML 1.4); Together Developer 2005 for JBuilder 2005; Together for C++ 2005; Together ControlCenter (and Solo) 6.2; Together Architect 1.1 (March 31, 2005) is a successor of Together ControlCenter 6.2; Together for SAP NetWeaver 6.2	Borland	2005	1.4 2.0	MS Visual Studio.NET 2003 Eclipse JBuilder 2005 SAP NetWeaver 6.2
Borland Together 2006, sold as 1 product: Together Architect 2006 for Eclipse; Together Designer 2006 for Eclipse; Together Developer 2006 for Eclipse	Borland	2006		Eclipse 3.1.0 with: Sun J2SE 1.5; Sun J2SE 1.4.2 on Linux and Solaris; Apple J2SE 1.4.2 on Mac OS X
Borland Together 2006 R	Borland	2006		Eclipse 3.x
Borland Together 2007	Borland	2007, Oct 31		Eclipse 3.3.x, Sun J2SE 5.0U11
Borland Together 2007 SP1	Borland	2007		Eclipse 3.3
Borland Together 2008 R2	Borland	2009, July 29		Eclipse 3.5
Borland Together 2008 R2 SP1	Borland			Eclipse 3.x
Borland Together 2008 R3	Borland	2010, Nov 17		Eclipse 3.6.1 Helios SR1
Borland Together 2008 R4	Borland: A Microfocus Company	2011, Sep 28		Eclipse 3.7.1 Indigo SR1
Borland Together 12.0	Borland: A Microfocus Company	2012, Oct 1		Eclipse 3.8.1 Juno SR1
Borland Together 12.5	Borland: A Microfocus Company	2013, Mar 22		Eclipse 4.2.2 Juno SR2
Borland Together 12.6	Borland: A Microfocus Company	2013, Nov 28		Eclipse 4.3.1 Kepler SR1

== Software description ==
Early versions (1–5) of Together were based on AWT and later on Java Swing. Last versions of Together (after 2002) are implemented as a set of Eclipse plugins. Together Developer provides Unified Modeling Language (UML) 1.4 & 2.0 modeling, multilanguage support, physical data modeling, design patterns, source code design pattern recognition, code template design and reuse, documentation generation, and code audits and metrics. It supports language-neutral UML 2.0 diagramming, business process modeling, and logical data model, and logical to physical data model transformation and custom pattern support.

BPMN diagrams can be created by import from and used to generate output to business process execution language with Web Services definitions (BPEL4WS). Audits and metrics are provided at both the model and code level, defined in Object Constraint Language (OCL) 2.0.

Together supported Design Patterns, Java 6, C++, CORBA, and Query/View/Transformation model transformations.

== Current situation ==
The product has no significant releases since 2013, however the last supported release v.14.0.0 was done in 2021.

The last version of the product that used a year instead of a number was Borland Together 2008 SP4, based on Eclipse and released in 2008.

== See also ==
- List of UML tools
- Rational Rose

== Links ==
- "Together Community forum by TogetherSoft". Archived from the original on 2002-09-11.
