= Precision Graphics Markup Language =

Two-dimensional vector image file format

PGML
- Precision Graphics Markup Language
- Abbreviation: PGML
- Status: Retired
- First published: 10 April 1998
- Organization: World Wide Web Consortium
- Authors: Nabeel Al-Shamma; Robert Ayers; Richard Cohn; Jon Ferraiolo; Martin Newell; Roger K. de Bry; Kevin McCluskey; Jerry Evans
- Base standards: PostScript; PDF
- Domain: 2D graphics language
- Website: www.w3.org/TR/1998/NOTE-PGML

Precision Graphics Markup Language (PGML) is an XML-based language for representing vector graphics. It was a World Wide Web Consortium (W3C) submission by Adobe Systems, IBM, Netscape, and Sun Microsystems, that was not adopted as a recommendation. PGML is a 2D graphical format, offering precision for graphic artists, guaranteeing that the design created will appear in end user systems with the correct formatting, layout and the precision of color.

PGML and Vector Markup Language, another XML-based vector graphics language W3C submission supported by Autodesk, Hewlett-Packard, Macromedia, Microsoft, and Visio Corporation, were later joined and improved upon to create Scalable Vector Graphics (SVG).

== Applications ==
The ArgoUML CASE tool is able to export UML diagrams in PGML.

== See also ==
- List of vector graphics markup languages
