= Open ModelSphere =

Open ModelSphere was a data, process and UML modeling tool written in Java and distributed as free software under the GPL License. It provided support for forward and reverse engineering between UML and relational schemas.

== History ==
Open ModelSphere has SILVERRUN PerfectO for an ancestor, proprietary software developed by Computer Systems Advisers and released in 1996. PerfectO was part of the SILVERRUN suite of modeling tools, known in the modeling community since the 1990s; PerfectO was used to support object-oriented modeling (limited to class modeling at that time) and object-relational modeling.

In 1998, PerfectO was translated into Java resulting in SILVERRUN-JD (Java Designer). With the addition of relational data modeling, the product was renamed to SILVERRUN ModelSphere and released in 2002. Later on, more features were added including support for business process modeling, conceptual data modeling, and UML diagramming.

In September 2008, Grandite released ModelSphere's core application as an open source product based on the GNU General Public License version 3. Its development environment was hosted on JavaForge which shut down March 31, 2016. An empty project is hosted on SourceForge which was registered on Sep 16th, 2008 and last updated on Mar 27th, 2013.

No releases, files, or source code are available anymore from Grandite as of Oct 18th, 2016. The remaining publicly available forks of the 3.0 codeline are based on Java 7, out of free support itself since 2015.

== Database support ==
Open ModelSphere works with

- Oracle
- Informix
- Microsoft SQL Server
- Sybase
- DB2
- PostgreSQL

== Releases ==
January 6, 2016: Open ModelSphere 3.2.2

- No release notes provided

November 2009: Open ModelSphere 3.1, featuring

- Core application based on Java 6
- New look & feel
- Interface to forward / reverse engineer Java code
- New mechanism to facilitate the use of plug-ins

September 2008: Open ModelSphere 3.0

- First open source release

July 2002: SILVERRUN ModelSphere 2.0

- Addition of business process modeling

February 2002: SILVERRUN ModelSphere 1.0

- Addition of relational modeling

== See also ==
- List of UML tools
- Entity-relationship model
