= Modelio =

Open-source UML tool developed by Modeliosoft

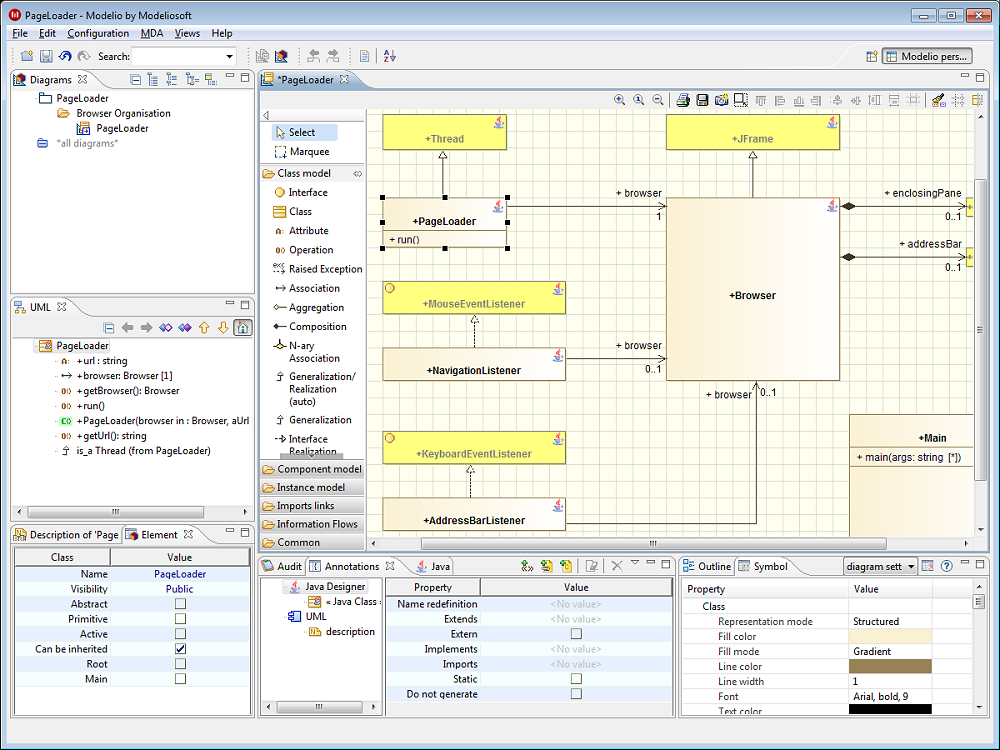
- Screenshot
- Developer: Modeliosoft
- Stable release: 6.2.0 / August 26, 2026; 28 days ago
- Operating system: Linux, Microsoft Windows, macOS
- Platform: x64
- Available in: English, French
- Type: Software modeling, Software development
- License: Core tool: GPLv3, Extensions: Apache License 2.0
- Website: www.modelio.org
- Repository: www.github.com/ModelioOpenSource/Modelio

Modelio is an open-source UML tool developed by Modeliosoft, based in Paris, France. It supports the UML2, BPMN and ArchiMate standards.

== Licensing ==
The core Modelio software was released under the GPLv3 on October 5, 2011. Key APIs are licensed under the more permissive Apache License 2.0.

== Features ==
Modelio supports UML2 Profiles for XSD, WSDL and BPEL, SoaML for service modelling in distributed environments;, BPMN for business process modelling and ArchiMate for Enterprise Architecture.

== Interoperability ==
Modelio was one of six tools participating in the Interoperability Demonstration held by the OMG's Model Interchange Working Group (MIWG) on December 7, 2009. The event demonstrated XMI interoperability between the participating tools.

The MADES Project intends to use Modelio to develop new modelling annotations with relevance to avionic and surveillance applications.

== Community modules ==
Add-on modules are available through the Modelio community Website. These add support for TOGAF business process modeling; SysML system architecture modeling (although with reduced functionality in the open source version, the requirement diagram type is not available); MARTE for specifying embedded systems, and Java code generation, reverse and roundtrip engineering.
