= CaseComplete =

Requirements management application

- Developer(s): Serlio Software
- Stable release: Pro v15 / June 2020
- Operating system: Microsoft Windows
- Type: Requirements Management
- License: Proprietary
- Website: casecomplete.com

CaseComplete is a requirements management application from Serlio Software that allows business analysts and software developers to create and manage Use Cases and Software Requirements. CaseComplete provides the ability to edit the textual portion of use cases and requirements in a guided environment and the ability to create various types of diagrams including use case diagrams, wireframes of graphical user interfaces, and flowcharts.

== Output ==
In 2012, Serlio Software released Requirements.cc, a web application that allows CaseComplete users to publish their requirements to the cloud.

CaseComplete also exports XML and XMI files.

== See also ==
- List of UML tools
- Requirements analysis
- Requirements management
