= Prosa UML Modeller =

Prosa UML Modeller assists software developers to design applications visually by using Unified Modeling Language. Unified Modeling Language - UML , is a standardized graphic notation developed to create visual models of object oriented software systems.

Prosa automates diagram creation and checking, and produces C++, C#, Java code headers and SQL DDL for implementation. Concurrent documentation ensures accurate documents which are consistent with the software design.

Prosa has integrations with programmer's workbenches, version control software, documentation tools and web pages.

Several designers can work concurrently in the same modeling project. The diagrams are locked so that only one designer is allowed to edit a diagram at a time. Standard security settings of the file system can be used to set designer specific read/write rights.

Prosa UML tool is a analysis and design tool.

Prosa is available for Microsoft Windows.

== Versions ==
- Prosa UML Modeller V5.24 for Windows, October 2013

== File Format ==
Prosa UML Modeller stores diagrams in ASCII text format.

== See also ==
- List of Unified Modeling Language tools
