= Eclipse Sirius =

Sirius
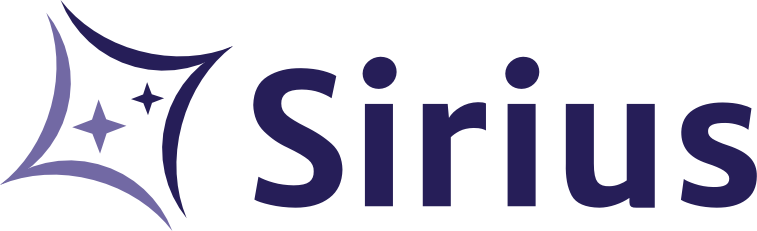

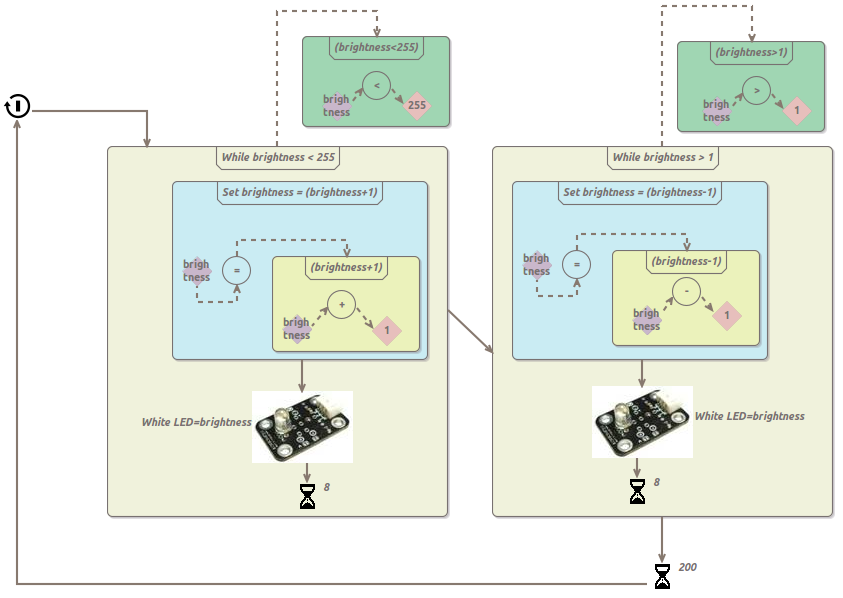
- Developer: Eclipse Foundation
- Stable release: 7.0.7 / January 19, 2023; 3 years ago
- Written in: Java
- Platform: Linux, macOS, Microsoft Windows
- Type: Framework
- License: Eclipse Public License
- Website: eclipse.dev/sirius/

Sirius is an open-source software project of the Eclipse Foundation. This technology allows users to create custom graphical modeling workbenches by leveraging the Eclipse Modeling technologies, including EMF and GMF. The modeling workbench created is composed of a set of Eclipse editors (diagrams, tables and trees) which allow the users to create, edit and visualize EMF models.

== History ==
Sirius is the result of a partnership launched in 2007 between Thales and Obeo. The initial goal was to provide a generic workbench for model-based architecture engineering that could be tailored to fit specific needs.

In 2013, the project was released in Open Source under the scope of the Eclipse Foundation. Sirius is integrated into annual release train of the Eclipse platform.

== Principles ==
Sirius enables the specification of a modeling workbench in terms of graphical, table or tree editors with validation rules and actions using declarative descriptions. All shape characteristics and behaviors can be configured with a minimum technical knowledge. This description is dynamically interpreted to materialize the workbench within the Eclipse IDE. No code generation is involved, the specifier of the workbench can have instant feedback while adapting the description. Once completed, the modeling workbench can be deployed as a standard Eclipse plugin.

Sirius provides a set of customizable and dynamic representations. These representations can be combined and customized according to the concept of Viewpoint, inspired from the ISO/IEC 42010 standard. Views, dedicated to a specific Viewpoint can adapt both their display and behavior depending on the model state and on the current concern. The same information can also be simultaneously represented through diagram, table or tree editors.

From the specifier/developer perspective, Sirius provides:

- The ability to define workbenches providing editors including diagrams, tables or trees.
- The ability to integrate and deploy the aforementioned environment into Eclipse IDE's or RCP applications.
- The ability to customize existing environments by specialization and extension.

From the end user perspective, Sirius provides:

- Rich and specialized modeling editors to design their models.
- Synchronization between these different editors.

== Uses ==
Sirius is mainly used to design complex systems (industrial systems or IT applications). The first use case was Capella, a Systems Engineering workbench contributed to the Eclipse Working Group PolarSys in 2014 by Thales.

The Sirius gallery on the project website lists some of the projects using Sirius.

== Compatibility ==
The latest release of Sirius is compatible with the following version of Eclipse:

- Eclipse Oxygen
- Eclipse Neon
- Eclipse 2020-09

Sirius is based on the modeling framework EMF. Thus it is compatible with any tool that can produce EMF compatible models.

== Community and communication ==
The Sirius community is gathered around the Sirius part of the website of the Eclipse Foundation. The Sirius documentation is accessible online on the Eclipse Help Center and on the wiki of the Sirius project.

=== Conferences ===
Each year the Sirius community meet at SiriusCon. The developers of Sirius are also communicating with the community thanks to presentation realized in Modeling or Eclipse conferences.

Name	Date	Location	Title of the presentation
EclipseCon North America 2013	26 March 2013	San Francisco, USA	Your custom modeling environment definition made easy. At last!
Dasia 2013	14 May 2013	Porto, Portugal	Multiple Viewpoints System / Software Engineering for Space
EclipseCon France 2013	6 June 2013	Toulouse, France	Sirius By Example: Build Your Own Diagram, Table and Tree Editors in 20 Minutes
Bicc Net 2013	30 September 2013	Munich, Germany	Open Tools for System Engineering and Embedded Systems
EclipseCon Europe 2013	29 October 2013	Ludwisburg, Germany	Turning Eclipse into an Arduino programming platform for kids
EclipseCon Europe 2013	30 October 2013	Ludwisburg, Germany	Sirius: Changing the Game of Systems Architecture
PolarSys Day 2013	22 November 2013	Stockholm, Sweden	Sirius: graphical editors for your DSL
CSDM 2013	4 December 2013	Paris, France	Sirius: Creation of Custom Modeling Workbenches Made Easy
EclipseCon North America 2014	18 March 2014	San Francisco, USA	Sirius-role-playing-game-build-diagram-table-and-tree-editors-20-minutes
Solutions Linux 2014	20 May 2014	Paris, France	Sirius : la nouvelle donne Open Source pour la conception de systèmes
Eclipse Day Florence 2014	23 May 2014	Florence, Italy	Sirius: build diagram, table and tree editors in 20 minutes!
XTextCon 2014	26 May 2014	Kiel, Germany	Sirius + Xtext
EclipseCon France 2014	18 June 2014	Toulouse, France	Hands-On Sirius: Create Graphical Editors for your Domain-Specific Language
Jug Summer Camp 2014	19 September 2014	La Rochelle, France	SIRIUS 1.0 : UN SCHÉMA VAUT MIEUX QU'UN LONG DISCOURS (in French)
RRLL Nantes 2014	19 September 2014	Nantes, France	Présentation Sirius (in French)
EclipseCon Europe 2014	29 October 2014	Ludwisburg, Germany	How to make Sirius shine?
Open World Forum 2014	31 October 2014	Paris, France	Sirius: the new Open Source way for systems design - The story of a successful collaboration between Obeo and Thales
Eclipse Finance Day 2014	31 October 2014	Zurich, Switzerland	Sirius for finance: create your own graphical designers for IT and EA
Eclipse Day Rhone Alpes 2014	18 December 2014	Lyon, France	Sirius - A graphic model is worth a thousand words
