= School of Electrical Engineering and Computer Science (University of Ottawa) =

Academic unit within the University of Ottawa

The School of Electrical Engineering and Computer Science, is an academic unit within The Faculty of Engineering, at the University of Ottawa. Until 2011 it was called the School of Information Technology and Engineering (SITE), which remains the name of a building on the southern edge of campus.

It was formed in 1997 by the merger of the Department of Computer Science and of the Department of Electrical and Computer Engineering.

It teaches undergraduate programs in Electrical Engineering, Software Engineering, Computer Engineering and Computer Science, and offers education up to the PhD level.
