= Cacoo =

Web-based diagram software

- Developer(s): Nulab Inc.
- Initial release: 2009
- Stable release: On-premise Enterprise version / 2013
- Type: Designs and diagrams
- Website: cacoo.com

Cacoo is web-based software for designing and drawing diagrams.

== History ==
Cacoo was launched in 2009 by Nulab, Inc. In 2013, the on-premise Enterprise version of the software was launched.

Cacoo is written in HTML5 and runs on major Window browsers and Mac operating systems.

== Usage ==
Cacoo is used for creating flowcharts, wireframes, UML diagrams, Organizational charts, and network diagrams.

== See also ==
- Web design
- Unified Modeling Language
- Computer network diagram
