= Open Services for Lifecycle Collaboration =

Open Services for Lifecycle Collaboration (OSLC) is an open community, originally proposed in 2008, to define a set of specifications that enable integration of software development. It has evolved, and continues to evolve, to areas such as Application Lifecycle Management (ALM), Product Lifecycle Management (PLM), IT Operations and more. The intention is to make life easier for tools users and tools vendors, by making it easier for tools to work together.

== Organization ==
The OSLC initiative is divided up into various OASIS TC (Organization for the Advancement of Structured Information Standards Technical Committees), as well as previously defined working groups and user groups. Each OASIS TC develops specifications in context of a specific part of the lifecycle. For example, there are OASIS TCs for Change and Configuration Management, Automation and Project Management for Contracted Delivery (Supply Chain). There is also a Core TC, which defines a common specification that is extended by each lifecycle TC.

As of June 2013, the OSLC initiative is a Member Section of the Open Standard Organization OASIS.

== Open specifications ==
OSLC is open in the sense that anybody can participate (e.g. in User Groups). To participate in the specification developing OASIS TCs, the participants have to sign the IPR policies to ensure irrevocability. The specifications are under Creative Commons licensing and can be freely implemented by anybody. Supporting the OSLC initiative there are open source projects for building an OSLC reference implementation and test suites for various programming languages and framework. The Eclipse Lyo project is one of the open source project which provides consumer and provider SDKs (primarily for Java), reference implementations, samples and test suite.

== Status ==
The effort was formalized in 2009 with the formation of the Change Management workgroup and participation of individuals from Accenture, Eclipse Mylyn/Tasktop, and IBM. Since then, new workgroups have formed around other lifecycle topics and individuals representing about 30 different organizations, including Oracle, Siemens, Northrop Grumman, Tieto, and General Motors. IBM's Cloud and Smarter Infrastructure brand is also starting to use OSLC as an integration technology.

== Technologies ==
The OSLC specifications build on the W3C Resource Description Framework (RDF), Linked Data and REST, enabling integration at data level via links between related resources. OSLC resources are defined in terms of RDF properties. Operations on resources are performed using HTTP. OSLC also specifies user interface techniques to enable preview, creation and selection of links.

== See also ==
- Application Lifecycle Management
- Functional Mock-up Interface
- Linked Data
- Product lifecycle management
- REST
