= No Magic =

American software company

No Magic, Inc.
- Industry: Computer software
- Founded: July 1995
- Headquarters: Allen, Texas U.S.
- Area served: Worldwide
- Products: MagicDraw
- Website: www.nomagic.com

No Magic, Inc. is a software company that develops solutions in the areas of object oriented design and development. No Magic has been in OMG (Object Management Group) standards based technologies and methods in the area of modelling, simulation and analysis for over 19 years.

== History ==
Established in July 1995, No Magic operates worldwide; software development facilities are located in the EU (Kaunas, Lithuania) and Thailand (Bangkok). No Magic's corporate and sales headquarters are located in Allen, Texas.

In 2002, MagicDraw won the Java Developer's Journal award for "Best Database Tool or Driver" category.

On October 25, 2017, No Magic announced an agreement to be acquired by Dassault Systèmes, subject to regulatory approval. The acquisition was completed in 2018.
