= EgoNet =

- Original author: Christopher McCarty
- Developer: University of Florida
- Stable release: 1.0.0 1ea8b79 / 20 May 2017; 9 years ago
- Written in: Java
- Operating system: Windows, macOS, Unix-like
- Platform: Java
- Available in: English
- Type: Social network analysis software
- License: GNU General Public License (GPL)
- Website: egonet.sf.net
- Repository: github.com/egonet/egonet

EgoNet (Egocentric Network Study Software) is a program for the collection and analysis of egocentric social network data. It helps the user to collect and analyse all the egocentric network data (all social network data of a website on the Internet), and provide general global network measures and data matrixes that can be used for further analysis by other software. The egonet is the result of the links that it gives and receives certain address on the Internet, and EgoNet is dedicated to collecting information about them and present it in a way useful to the users.

Egonet is written in Java, so that the computer where it is going to be used must have the JRE installed. EgoNet is open source software, licensed under GPL.

Egonet was created by Christopher McCarty, a professor at the University of Florida, United States.

== Features ==
The program allows to create questionnaires, collect data and provide comprehensive measures and arrays of data that can be used for subsequent analysis by other software. Its main benefits are the generation of questionnaires for relational data, the calculation of relevant General measurements for the analysis of social networks and production graphs.

== Components ==
Egonet is composed of the following modules:

- EgoNetW, that allows to create formats of questionnaires for the pursuit of studies;
- EgoNetClientW: used for data load - once defined the relevant questions and the structure of the questionnaires.

== See also ==
- Graphviz
- GraphStream
- graph-tool
- JUNG
- NetworkX
- Tulip
