= Meurs Challenger =

- Developer(s): Meurs HRM
- Written in: ActionScript
- Operating system: Cross-platform
- Type: Visualization
- Website: www.q1000.ro/challenger/

Meurs Challenger is an online graph visualization program, with data analysis and browsing.

The software supports several graph layout algorithms, and allows the user to interact with the nodes. The displayed data can be filtered using textual search, node and edge type, or based on the graph distance between nodes. Written in ActionScript, the program runs on Windows, Linux, macOS and other platforms that support the Adobe Flash Player.

Meurs Challenger was the winner at the 2011 edition of the International Symposium on Graph Drawing, in the large graph category.

It is publicly available as a Facebook application, which displays the network graph of the user's friends.

== Implementation approach ==
The main problem in network visualization is to reduce data complexity by projecting a multivariate data matrix onto a lower-dimensional planar display space, which is achieved by proper node positioning.

Meurs Challenger addresses this by combining several different approaches:

- force-based algorithms
- modularization techniques
- clustering
- node overlap minimization, which is achieved by guaranteeing a minimum edge length between two linked nodes
- edge length uniformization, using an algorithm that minimizes the total edge length discrepancy of the projected graph
- grid-based layouts

== See also ==
- Graph (discrete mathematics)
- Graph drawing
- Graph theory
- Graph (data structure)
- Social network analysis software
- GraphML
