= NodeXL =

Network analysis and visualization package for Microsoft Excel

- Developer: Social Media Research Foundation
- Release: July 2008; 18 years ago
- Stable release: 1.0.1.238 / 8 April 2013; 13 years ago
- Written in: C#, .NET Framework
- Operating system: Windows
- Size: 7.8 MB
- Available in: English
- Type: Data analysis, Data visualization
- License: Microsoft Public License
- Website: nodexlgraphgallery.org

NodeXL is a network analysis and visualization software package for Microsoft Excel 2007/2010/2013/2016. The package is similar to other network visualization tools such as Pajek, UCINet, and Gephi. It is widely applied in ring, mapping of vertex and edge, and customizable visual attributes and tags. NodeXL enables researchers to undertake social network analysis work metrics such as centrality, degree, and clustering, as well as monitor relational data and describe the overall relational network structure. When applied to Twitter data analysis, it showed the total network of all users participating in public discussion and its internal structure through data mining. It allows social Network analysis (SNA) to emphasize the relationships rather than the isolated individuals or organizations, allowing interested parties to investigate the two-way dialogue between organizations and the public. SNA also provides a flexible measurement system and parameter selection to confirm the influential nodes in the network, such as in-degree and out-degree centrality. The software contains network visualization, social network analysis features, access to social media network data importers, advanced network metrics, and automation.

== Codebase ==
NodeXL is a set of prebuilt class libraries using a custom Windows Presentation Foundation control. Additional .NET assemblies can be developed as "plug-ins" to import data from outside data providers. Currently-implemented data providers for NodeXL include YouTube, Twitter, Wikipedia (the MediaWiki understructure), web hyperlinks, Microsoft Exchange Server.

=== Contributors ===
NodeXL is a collaborative effort of a number of individuals from different universities and other organizations forming the NodeXL Team. Notable contributors include:

- Microsoft Research Cambridge
- Connected Action Consulting Group
- University of Maryland
- Brigham Young University
- University of Porto
- Stanford University
- Oxford Internet Institute
- University of Georgia
- Illinois Institute of Technology
- Australian National University
- Cornell University
- Morningside Analytics
- Northeastern University

Microsoft Research established a NodeXL research project on November 20, 2008.

== Features ==
NodeXL is intended for users with little or no programming experience to allow them to collect, analyze, and visualize a variety of networks. NodeXL integrates into Microsoft Excel 2007, 2010, 2013, 2016, 2019 and 365 and opens as a workbook with a variety of worksheets containing the elements of a graph structure such as edges and nodes. NodeXL can also import a variety of graph formats such as edgelists, adjacency matrices, GraphML, UCINet .dl, and Pajek .net.

=== Data import ===
NodeXL Pro imports UCINet and GraphML files, as well as Excel spreadsheets containing edge lists or adjacency matrices, into NodeXL workbooks. NodeXL Pro also allows for the quick collection of social media data via a set of import tools which can collect network data from e-mail, Twitter, YouTube, and Flickr. NodeXL asks for the user's permission before collecting any personal data and focuses on the collection of publicly available data, such as Twitter statuses and follows relationships for users who have made their accounts public. These features allow NodeXL users to instantly get working on relevant social media data and integrate aspects of social media data collection and analysis into a single tool.

=== Data representation ===
NodeXL workbooks contain four worksheets: Edges, Vertices, Groups, and Overall Metrics. The relevant data about entities in the graph and relationships between them are located in the appropriate worksheet in row format. For example, the edges worksheet contains a minimum of two columns, and each row has a minimum of two elements corresponding to the two vertices that make up an edge in the graph. Graph metrics and edge and vertex visual properties appear as additional columns in the respective worksheets. This representation allows the user to leverage the Excel spreadsheet to quickly edit existing node properties and to generate new ones, for instance by applying Excel formulas to existing columns.

=== Graph analysis ===
NodeXL Pro contains a library of commonly used graph metrics: centrality, clustering coefficient, and diameter. NodeXL differentiates between directed and undirected networks. NodeXL Pro implements a variety of community detection algorithms to allow the user to automatically discover clusters in their social networks.

=== Graph visualization ===
NodeXL generates an interactive canvas for visualizing graphs. The project allows users to pick from several well-known Force-directed graph drawing layout algorithms such as Fruchterman-Reingold and Harel-Koren. NodeXL allows the user to multi-select, drag and drop nodes on the canvas and to manually edit their visual properties (size, color, and opacity). In addition, NodeXL enables users to map the visual properties of nodes and edges to metrics it calculates, and in general to any column in the edges and vertices worksheet. Using the YouTube API, NodeXL enables researchers to solicit videos and viewers' comments with titles, keywords, descriptions and users' IDs. The collected data can then be visualized via algorithms and methods, for example, Harel–Koren fast multiscale algorithm, Clauset–Newman–Moore algorithm, Treema, force-directed.

== Research ==
NodeXL has been used by news outlets such as Foreign Policy to visualize the structure of conversations about political topics as well as by organizations like the World Bank to analyze voting data. NodeXL has been used as an analytical tool in dozens (Note: 585 references) of research papers in the social, information, and computer sciences, as well as the focus of research in human–computer interaction, data mining, and data visualization.

== See also ==
- Graph drawing
- Social network analysis software

File formats

- GraphML (NodeXL Pro only)
- Geographic Data Files
- GEXF
- Pajek

Related software

- Cytoscape
- Gephi
