= Gephi =

Network analysis and visualization software package

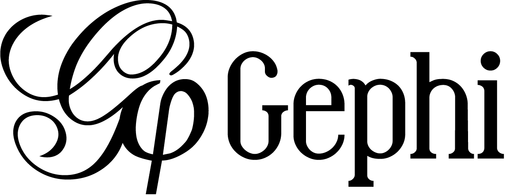

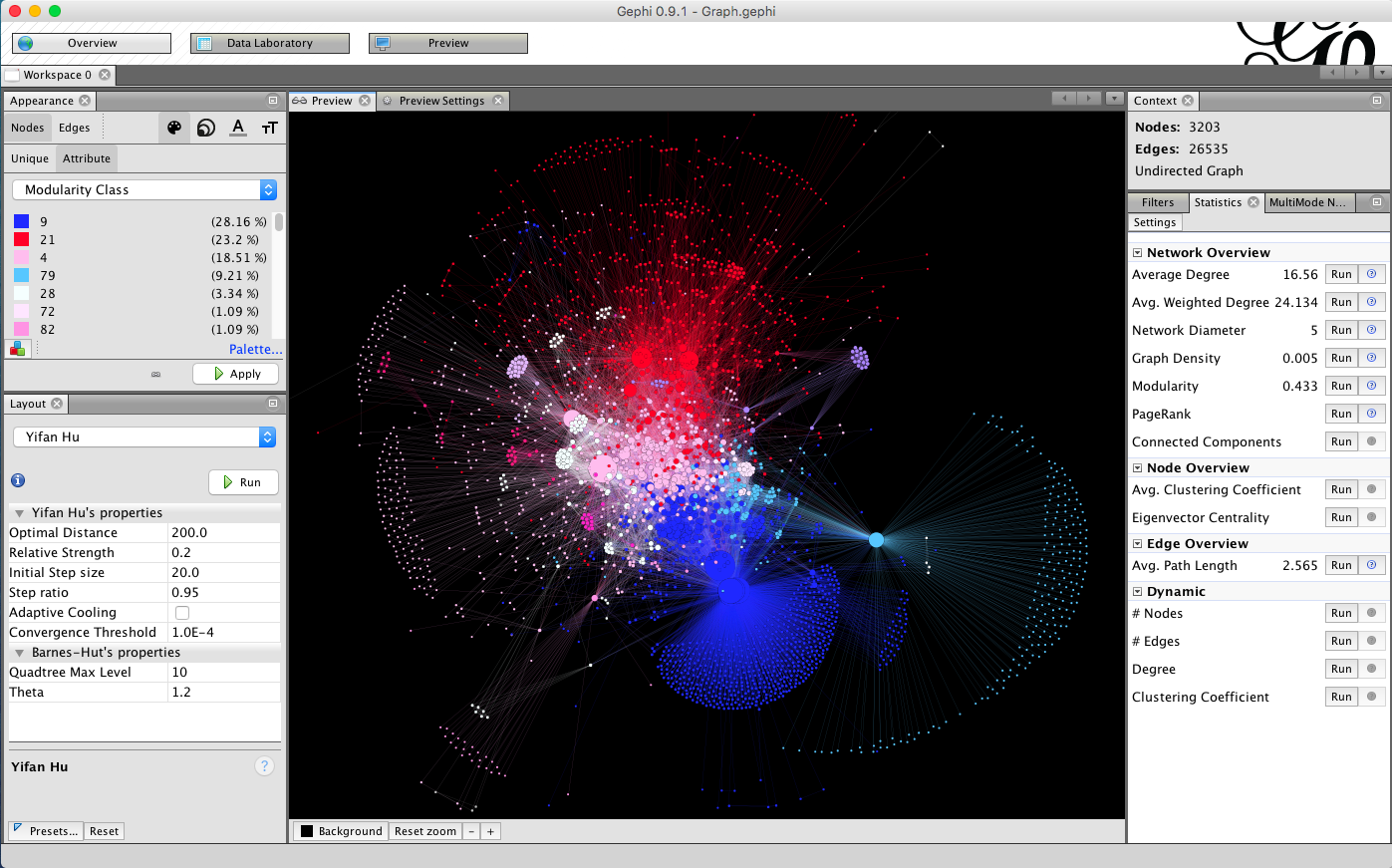
- Developers: Mathieu Bastian, Eduardo Ramos Ibañez, Mathieu Jacomy, Cezary Bartosiak, Sébastien Heymann, Julian Bilcke, Patrick McSweeney, André Panisson, Jérémy Subtil, Helder Suzuki, Martin Skurla, Antonio Patriarca
- Release: 31 July 2008; 18 years ago
- Stable release: 0.11.2 / 9 May 2026; 3 months ago
- Written in: Java, OpenGL
- Operating system: Linux, Windows, macOS
- Platform: NetBeans
- Size: 121.1 MB
- Available in: English, French, Spanish, Japanese, Russian, Brazilian Portuguese, Chinese, Czech, German, Romanian, Greek, Hungarian, Korean, Swedish, Ukrainian
- Type: Visualization
- License: GNU General Public License, Common Development and Distribution License
- Website: gephi.org
- Repository: github.com/gephi/gephi

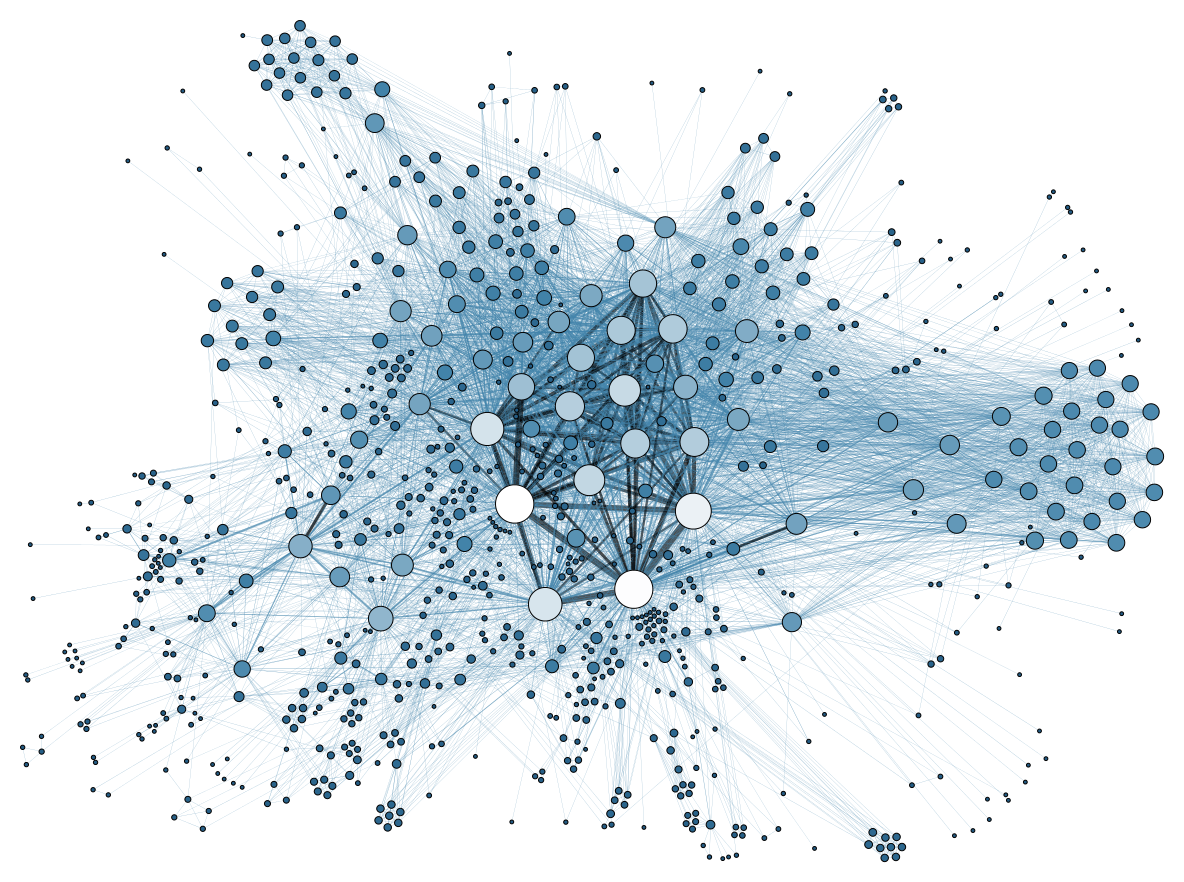
Example of Gephi network visualization

Gephi (/ˈɡɛfi/ GHEF-ee) is an open-source network analysis and visualization software package written in Java on the NetBeans platform.

== History ==
Initially developed by students of the University of Technology of Compiègne (UTC) in France, Gephi has been selected for the Google Summer of Code in 2009, 2010, 2011, 2012, and 2013.

Its last version, 0.11.2 has been launched in 2026. Previous versions are 0.6.0 (2008), 0.7.0 (2010), 0.8.0 (2011), 0.8.1 (2012), 0.8.2 (2013), 0.9.0 (2015), 0.9.1 (2016), 0.9.2 (2017). and 0.10.1 (2023).

Previously known as Gephi Consortium, the Gephi community, created in 2010, is a French non-profit organisation which supports development of future releases of Gephi and Gephi Lite. Gephi is also supported by a large community of tens of thousands users, producing numerous blogposts, academic papers and tutorials.

In November 2022, a lightweight web version of Gephi, Gephi Lite, was announced.

== Applications ==
Gephi has been used in a number of research projects in academia, journalism and elsewhere, for instance in visualizing the global connectivity of New York Times content and examining Twitter network traffic during social unrest along with more traditional network analysis topics. Gephi is widely used within the digital humanities (in history, literature, political sciences, etc.), a community where many of its developers are involved.

Gephi inspired the LinkedIn InMaps and was used for the network visualizations for Truthy.

== See also ==
- Graph (discrete mathematics)
- Graph drawing
- Graph theory
- Graph (data structure)
- Social network analysis software

File formats

- Dot language
- GraphML
- Graph Modelling Language

Related software

- Cytoscape
- Graph-tool
- Graphviz
- Tulip (software)
- yEd
- AllegroGraph
- NetworkX
- NodeXL
- Pajek
- NetMiner
