= Graph Modelling Language =

ASCII-based file format for describing graphs

- Filename extension: .gml
- Internet media type: text/vnd.gml
- Developed by: Michael Himsolt

Graph Modeling Language (GML) is a hierarchical ASCII-based file format for describing graphs. It has been also named Graph Meta Language.

== Example ==
A simple graph in GML format:

graph [
	comment "This is a sample graph"
	directed 1
	id 42
	label "Hello, I am a graph"
	node [
		id 1
		label "node 1"
		thisIsASampleAttribute 42
	]
	node [
		id 2
		label "node 2"
		thisIsASampleAttribute 43
	]
	node [
		id 3
		label "node 3"
		thisIsASampleAttribute 44
	]
	edge [
		source 1
		target 2
		label "Edge from node 1 to node 2"
	]
	edge [
		source 2
		target 3
		label "Edge from node 2 to node 3"
	]
	edge [
		source 3
		target 1
		label "Edge from node 3 to node 1"
	]
]

== Applications supporting GML ==
- Cytoscape, an open source bioinformatics software platform for visualizing molecular interaction networks, loads and save previously-constructed interaction networks in GML.
- igraph, an open source network analysis library with interfaces to multiple programming languages.
- Gephi, an open source graph visualization and manipulation software.
- Graph-tool, a free Python module for manipulation and statistical analysis of graphs.
- NetworkX, an open source Python library for studying complex graphs.
- Tulip (software) is a free software in the domain of information visualisation capable of manipulating huge graphs (with more than 1.000.000 elements).
- yEd, a free Java-based graph editor, supports import from and export to GML.
- The Graphviz project includes two command-line tools (gml2gv and gv2gml) that can convert to and from the DOT file format.
- Wolfram Language, a general very high-level programming language, supports GML import and export.

== See also ==
- Graph Query Language (GQL)
- DGML
