= Tiago Peixoto =

Tiago Peixoto may refer to:

- Tiago C. Peixoto, Brazilian political scientist
- Tiago P. Peixoto, Brazilian physicist
