= Helen Purchase =

Helen C. Purchase is a researcher in information visualization, graph drawing, and human–computer interaction. She has held academic appointments at The University of Queensland (1992-2001), The University of Glasgow (2001-2022) and Monash University (2022-present).

Purchase earned a PhD from the University of Cambridge (Peterhouse, 1992).

She has won Teaching Excellence Awards from The University of Queensland (1999) and The University of Glasgow (2011).

Purchase has been a Keynote Speaker at the following conferences:

- 12e Conférence Internationale Francophone sur l'Extraction et la Gestion des Connaissances (EGC 2012, Bordeaux, France)
- 7th International Symposium on Visual Information Communication & Interaction (VINCI 2014, Sydney, Australia)
- IEEE Working Conference on Software Visualization (VISSOFT 2018, Madrid, Spain)
- International Conference on Information Visualization Theory and Applications (IVAPP 2020, Valletta, Malta)
- Southern African Computer Lecturers' Association Conference (SACLA 2020, Virtual from Rhodes University, Grahamstown, South Africa)
- OxBridge Women in Computer Science Conference (OxWoCS 2020, Virtual from The University of Cambridge, UK)

She is the author of Experimental Human-Computer Interaction (Cambridge University Press, 2012)
