= DGML =

- Developed by: Microsoft
- Initial release: September 2009; 16 years ago
- Type of format: Directed graph
- Extended from: XML
- Website: docs.microsoft.com/en-us/visualstudio/modeling/directed-graph-markup-language-dgml-reference

Directed Graph Markup Language (DGML) is an XML-based file format for directed graphs.

== Introduction to DGML ==
Here is what a simple directed graph with three nodes and two links between them looks like

<?xml version="1.0" encoding="utf-8"?>
<DirectedGraph xmlns="https://schemas.microsoft.com/vs/2009/dgml">
  <Nodes>
    <Node Id="a" Label="a" Size="10" />
    <Node Id="b" Background="#FF008080" Label="b" />
    <Node Id="c" Label="c" Start="2010-06-10" />
  </Nodes>
  <Links>
    <Link Source="a" Target="b" />
    <Link Source="a" Target="c" />
  </Links>
  <Properties>
    <Property Id="Background" Label="Background" DataType="Brush" />
    <Property Id="Label" Label="Label" DataType="String" />
    <Property Id="Size" DataType="String" />
    <Property Id="Start" DataType="DateTime" />
  </Properties>
</DirectedGraph>

which looks like this:

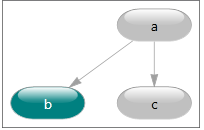

The complete XSD schema for DGML is available at . DGML not only allows describing nodes and links in a graph, but also annotating those nodes and links with any user defined property and/or category.

== See also ==
- DOT (graph description language)
- Graphviz
- Microsoft Visio
- Graph Modelling Language
