= TGF =

TGF may refer to:

== Medicine ==
- Tubuloglomerular feedback, a reflex of the nephrons in the kidney
- Transforming growth factor, either of two classes of polypeptide growth factors (TGF-α and TGF-β)

== Science ==
- Terrestrial gamma-ray flash, a burst of gamma rays produced in the Earth's atmosphere, generally associated with lightning
- Tidal Generating Force, an effect of gravity responsible for creating tides
- Trivial Graph Format, a text-based file format for describing graphs

== Entertainment ==
- The Games Factory, video game development software created by Clickteam
- The Gracious Few, an American rock group from York, Pennsylvania
- TGFbro, British YouTube duo

== Other ==
- Chali language, by ISO 639 code
