= Igraph =

Free library software for graphs

igraph
- Original author(s): Gábor Csárdi and Tamás Nepusz
- Developer(s): Gábor Csárdi, Tamás Nepusz, Szabolcs Horvát, Vincent Traag, Fabio Zanini and Daniel Noom
- Initial release: 2006
- Stable release: 0.10.15 / 6 November 2024; 4 months ago
- Repository: github.com/igraph/igraph
- Written in: C and C++
- Operating system: Cross-platform
- Type: Science software
- License: GPL-2.0-or-later
- Website: igraph.org

igraph is a library collection for creating and manipulating graphs and analyzing networks. It is written in C and also exists as Python and R packages. There exists moreover an interface for Mathematica. The software is widely used in academic research in network science and related fields. The publication that introduces the software has 13502 citations as of July 3, 2024 according to Google Scholar.

igraph was originally developed by Gábor Csárdi and Tamás Nepusz. It is written in the C programming language in order to achieve good performance and it is freely available under GNU General Public License Version 2.

== Basic properties ==
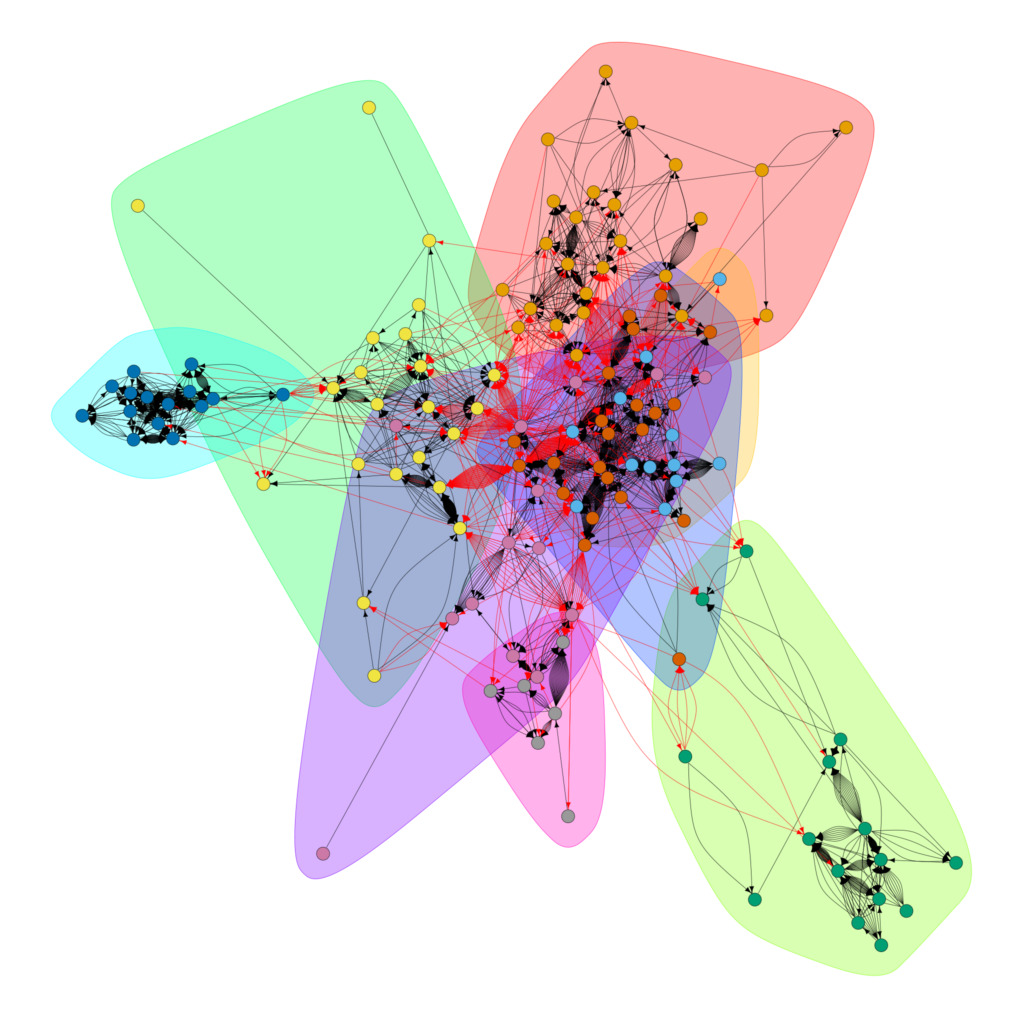
An example of a graph created using igraph, representing the email network of the Enron Corpus

The three most important properties of igraph that shaped its development are as follows:

- igraph is capable of handling large networks efficiently
- it can be productively used with a high-level programming language
- interactive and non-interactive usage are both supported

== Characteristics ==
The software is open source, source code can be downloaded from the project's GitHub page. There are several open source software packages that use igraph functions. As an example, R packages tnet, igraphtosonia and cccd depend on igraph R package. Users can use igraph on many operating systems. The C library and R and Python packages need the respective software, otherwise igraph is portable. The C library of igraph is well documented as well as the R package and the Python package

== Functions ==
igraph can be used to generate graphs, compute centrality measures and path length based properties as well as graph components and graph motifs. It also can be used for degree-preserving randomization. igraph can read and write file formats such as Pajek, GraphML, LGL, NCOL, DIMACS, and GML, as well as simple edge lists. The library contains several layout tools as well.
