= Telecom Corridor Genealogy Project =

The Telecom Corridor Genealogy Project is the result of the collaboration of the Richardson Chamber of Commerce and the Center for Information Technology and Management (CITM) in the School of Management at the University of Texas at Dallas, with the purpose of creating not only a multidimensional diagram of the relationship of companies and their employees in the high tech sector, but also to enable professionals in the tech sector to interact in a social networking framework that has certain advantages over general websites such as LinkedIN.

The project is intended to follow tens of thousands of companies to give a true multidimensional diagram of the history of the area's "corporate DNA". This is going to be a living database that will continue to evolve as long as the tech sector exists."

== Summary ==
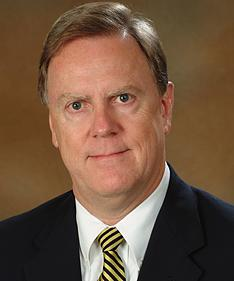
Paul Peck, CEO of GSCS and founder of the Telecom Corridor Genealogy Project

The original concept was developed as a Tool for Economic Development in 2003 by Paul Peck to create a social networking website for professionals in the Richardson Telecom Corridor.

The idea behind the project was to develop a History Framework and database for the Telecom Corridor and to thereby illustrate the Telecom Corridor’s Highly Networked Community. In order to prove and illustrate the environment and fertile ground for new start-ups and relocating companies the project demonstrates the family like bonds and history of the local companies and their executives. It is also to simplify and increase networking among area companies and their executives through the common thread that they share and to push networking to a higher level.

== History ==
The Telecom Corridor Genealogy Project started in February 2003 as a tool for economic development for the region that is called the Telecom Corridor.
The concept was first outlined in discussions at the Richardson Economic Development Technology Advisory Board (REDTAB) and further developed with the help of the Metroplex Technology Business Council 3rd Friday Tech Luncheon Committee.

In March 2003 the founder Paul Peck had already been able to collect 300 entries of 100 different people for the database. In order to get more momentum for the project he decided to seek out the local University - University of Texas at Dallas in April 2003. He met with Dr. Michael Savoie, director of the Center for Information Technology and Management (CITM) in the School of Management at The University of Texas at Dallas. Shortly after this meeting Dr. Savoie and his center developed a program to manage the database and hosted it on UT Dallas website for people to contribute their data online.

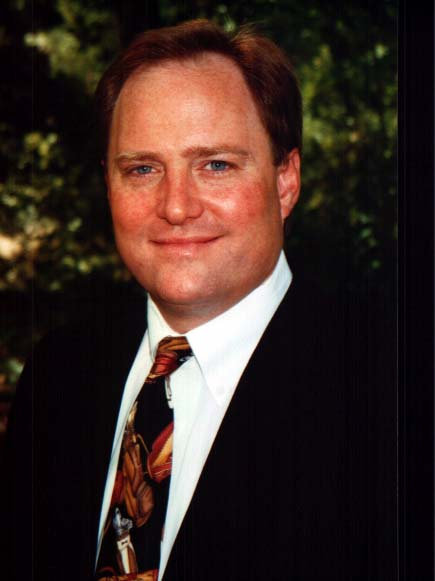
Dr. Michael J. Savoie, Ph.D., serves as the Director of the Center for Information Technology and Management (CITM) in the School of Management at the University of Texas at Dallas. He helped developing a program to manage the database of the Telecom Corridor Genealogy Project.

Dr. Michael Savoie said:

"We're doing the Telecom Corridor Genealogy Project, which is huge. We're generating a 40-year family tree of the companies and individuals that have worked in the North Texas technology sector. For one thing, it's a tremendously valuable tool for the Chamber of Commerce and economic development corporations in the area. It's also a great way for people in the tech sector to reconnect and be able to find people they used to work with. We are working with tens of thousands of companies to give a true multidimensional diagram of the history of technology. This is going to be a living database that will continue to evolve as long as the tech sector exists.

As a result of this work the database grew about 400 entries and 150 individuals and first results from the data were shown at the Metroplex Technology Business Council (MTBC) Executive Committee. In May 2003 the committee allowed Mr. Peck and Dr. Savoie to use the trademark Telecom Corridor in the name of the project. Subsequently the project became known all over the Telecom Corridor and Dallas/Fort Worth Metroplex due to its rapid growth and was subject in interviews, photos (Peck, Hicks, Savoie & Robinson). It was published in the Dallas Morning News, Sunday Business Section, Page 1 in June 2003 and a Radio Interview with Paul Peck & Art Roberts on “Tech in Touch”, WBAP 820, with Kym Yancey followed shortly after that.

A next step in the project was the addition of company profile/history data (by Jerry Cupples) for cross-referencing purposes in July 2003. Following was another meeting with Dr. Savoie, including (CITM) Members & Claire Lewis the preliminary Telecom Corridor Genealogy Project Web Page was developed and online at the (CITM). After the project grew in 2003 the Dallas Morning News followed up and published a 2nd article in June 2004; almost exactly 1 year after the first. Due to limited human resources the project lay dormant until February 2010.

In February 2010 the Richardson Chamber of Commerce's Economic Development Partnership decided to revive the project and approached Paul Peck with the idea of providing and intern for him to help him with the project. Due to the time that has passed since '04 the revival process seemed even harder considering what had changed in world of social media and the upcoming web 2.0.
Questions had to be answered. What can the project do that a LinkedIN or Facebook can't. That involved a lot of research on social networks and business networks and even social network software applications.

== About Regional Economic Development ==
Conventional economic development policies are believed not to be universally usable for attracting high-tech firms to areas/cities, but rather that those locate in clusters with certain characteristics:

- "[...]the presence of a strong, scientifically oriented university that can be called upon to work with businesses in their research endeavors and spin-off new high-tech firms, as well as to perform the more traditional role of producing a well educated pool of employees;
- a technology center to act as an intellectual resource around which high-tech firms can concentrate;
- the availability of venture capital to provide seed money for the early stages of start-up companies; and
- an entrepreneurial, risk-taking business climate[...]"

Even though the Telecom Corridor Genealogy Project had only been founded in 2003 there were reports and talks about the significance of the history of companies and their workforce in this area since the early 1990s. That history matters in economic development is widely agreed upon and the history of the companies and their family tree got captured and referred to by many authors.

== Vision and goals ==
The future vision is to promote further networking among area companies and their executives through the common thread that they share and to push networking to a higher level modeling Silicon Valley community network with rapid knowledge flows and high supply chain relationships through...

== Previous models ==
The idea of the project was and still is influenced by other similar models of regional business "family tree" projects. The regional business family tree that is most famous is the Silicon Valley Fairchild family tree. The Fairchild project resulted in a map that shows the genealogy of the companies in Silicon Valley that spun out or were acquired by Fairchild semiconductors from 1957 till 1979 (Silicon Valley Genealogy Map). Another economic development related project was done by the ACEnet and the social network software provider InFlow. The project resulted in the analysis of the food industry in Athens, Ohio and produced a better connected business community and the understanding for the same.

"[...]Communities are built on connections. Better connections usually provide better opportunities [...] How do we build connected communities that create, and take advantages of, opportunities in their region or marketplace [...] ()"
