= NetMiner =

Application software

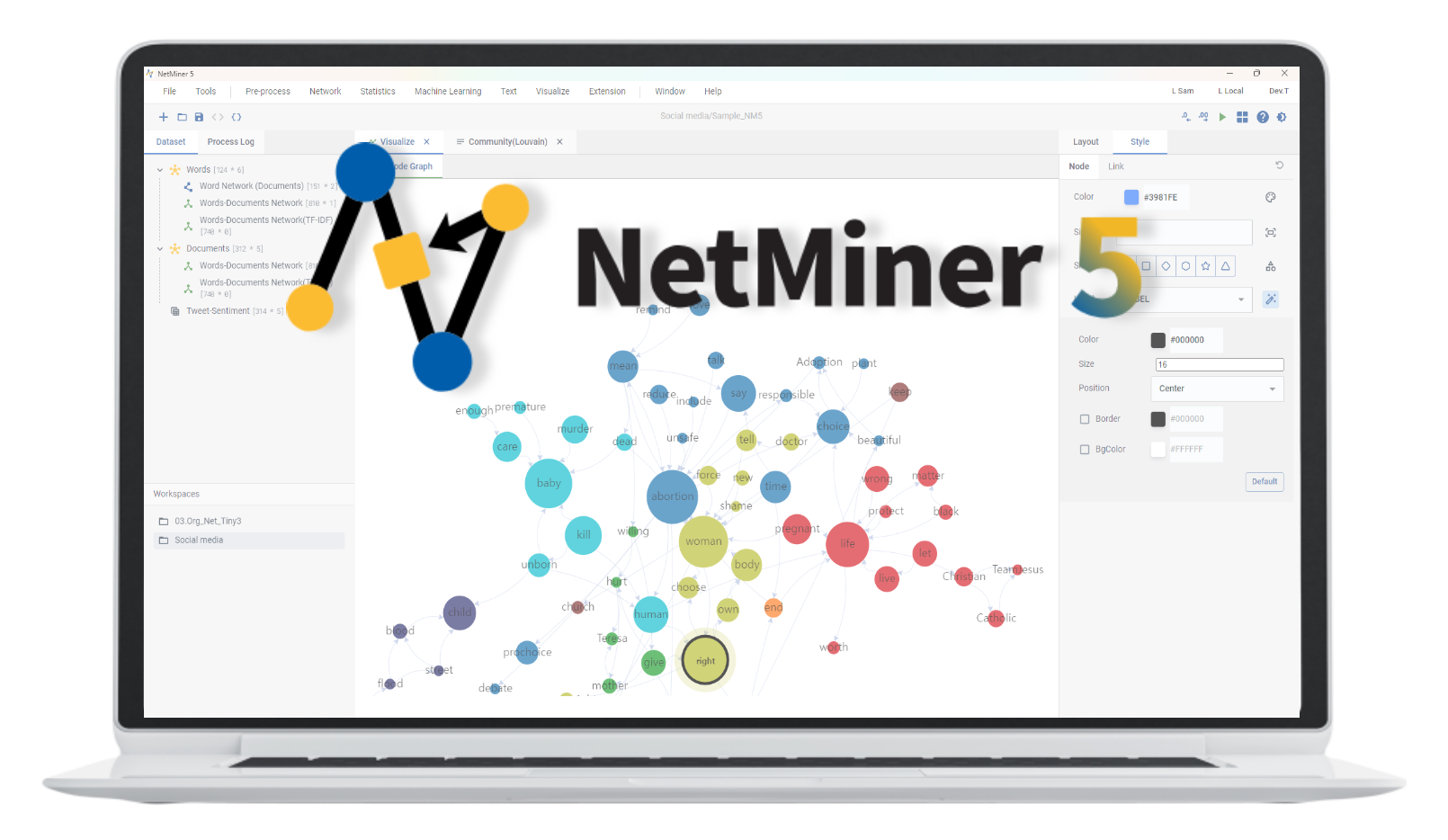
- Developer: Cyram
- Release: December 21, 2001
- Stable release: 5.0 / June 9, 2025; 17 months ago
- Written in: JavaScript; Python
- Operating system: Windows 10, 11; macOS
- Available in: English and Korean (Spanish, Chinese and Japanese in AI Assistant)
- Type: SNA; GNN; ML; Graph drawing
- Website: www.netminer.com/en/

NetMiner is a software platform for analyzing and visualizing complex network data, based on Social Network Analysis (SNA). Originally released in 2001, it supports research and education through interactive and visual data exploration. This tool allows researchers to explore their network data visually and interactively, and helps them to detect underlying patterns and structures of the network. It has also been recognized for its features and interface in comparative reviews of SNA software packages.

== Features ==
=== Integrated Data Environment ===
NetMiner supports unified management of diverse data types—including network (nodes and links), tabular, and unstructured text data—within a single platform. This enables users to perform the entire analysis workflow. NetMiner also supports a wide range of analytical methods, allowing users to derive new insights by combining multiple approaches. Analytical results can be saved and reused across workflows.

- Graph and Network Analysis: Includes Centrality, Community Detection, Blockmodeling, and Similarity Measures.
- Machine learning: Provides algorithms for regression, classification, clustering, ensemble modeling and XAI(Explainable AI)
- Graph Neural Networks (GNNs): Supports models such as GraphSAGE, GCN, and GAT to learn from both node attributes and graph structure.
- Natural language processing (NLP): Uses pretrained deep learning models to analyze unstructured text, including named entity recognition and keyword extraction.
- Text mining and Text network analysis: Supports construction of word co-occurrence networks and topic modeling using LDA, BERTopic, enabling identification of thematic patterns and semantic structures in text data.
- Data Visualization: Offers advanced network visualization features, supporting multiple layout algorithms. Analytical outcomes such as centrality or community detection can be directly reflected in the network map via node size, color, and position, enhancing intuitive understanding.

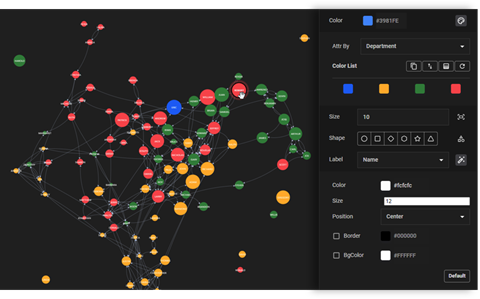
Network visualization in dark mode

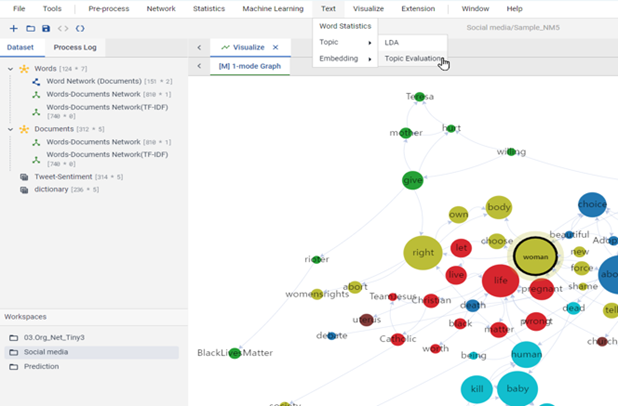
Word Co-Occurrence Network

=== AI Assistant ===
NetMiner integrates with external large language models such as OpenAI GPT and Google Gemini to interpret complex analysis results in natural language, summarize key findings, and suggest next steps for exploration.

=== Workflow and usability ===
Designed to follow the structure of real-world data analysis workflows, NetMiner adopts a hierarchical data organization (Project → Workspace → Dataset → Data Item). Its web-based user interface improves clarity and reduces complexity.

NetMiner 5 supports Windows 10 or higher and macOS 11 or later with M1 chip.

== Extension ==
NetMiner Extension is small program to extend the functionality of NetMiner. In other words, it enables you to customize NetMiner according to your needs. By adding ‘NetMiner Extension’, you can expand your research.

=== Web Data Collection ===
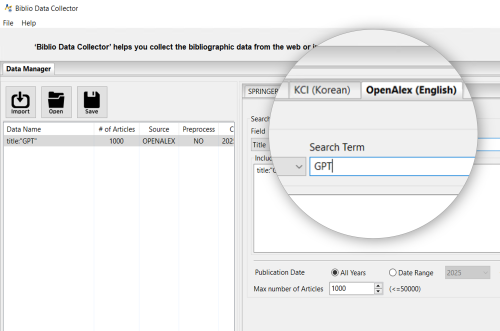

NetMiner allows users to collect data from services such as YouTube, OpenAlex, Springer, and KCI via Open APIs. Collected data is automatically preprocessed and transformed to fit NetMiner’s internal structure, requiring no additional coding or external tools.

- SNS Data Collector: It collects social media data from YouTube, which has a large number of social media users worldwide.
- Biblio Data Collector: It collects the bibliographic data from Springer, OpenAlex, and KCI essential for research trend analysis.

== File formats ==
=== NetMiner data file format ===
- .NMF

=== Importable/exportable formats ===
- Plain text data: .TXT, .CSV
- Microsoft Excel data: .XLS, .XLSX
- Unstructured text data: .TXT, .CSV, .XLS(X)

※ NetMiner 4 only

- NetMiner 2 data: .NTF
- UCINet data: .DL, .DAT
- Pajek data: .NET, .VEC, .CLU, .PER
- StOCNET data file: .DAT
- Graph Modelling Language data: .GML(importing only)

Related software

- UCINET
- Pajek
- Gephi
- StoCNET

== Data structure ==
=== Hierarchy of NetMiner data structure ===
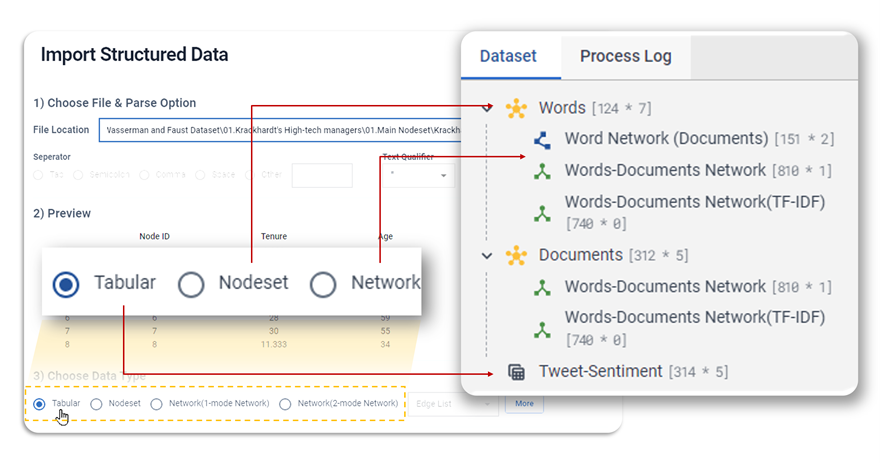
Hierarchical structure of NetMiner data

NetMiner 5 supports not only graph data composed of nodes and links, but also tabular and unstructured data without fixed schema or identifiers. This enables users to easily import a wide variety of raw and unstructured data suitable for machine learning applications. Within a single workspace, users can manage node sets, link sets, and structured/unstructured data simultaneously. Multiple graph layers under a node set can be organized in a tree structure, allowing for intuitive understanding of the data currently being analyzed.

== Release history ==
The first version of NetMiner was released on Dec 21, 2001. There have been five major updates from 2001.

=== NetMiner 5 ===
Released on June 9, 2025. NetMiner 5 retains the core features and no-code concept of NetMiner 4, but has evolved by integrating cutting-edge AI technologies.

- AI Assistant, Personal Analytics Tutor
- Support for Graph, Structured, and Unstructured Data
- Graph Analytics / Social Network Analysis
- Machine Learning(M/L) & XAI
- Graph Machine Learning(GML): Graph Neural Network
- Text Mining: Natural Language Processing(NLP), Text Network, Topic Modeling
- Data Visualization

=== NetMiner 4 (2011) ===
Latest version is 4.5.1.

Introduced Python scripting, encrypted NMF format, semantic analysis tools (word cloud, topic modeling), and Extension - Data Collector.

=== NetMiner 3 (2007) ===
Enhanced scalability, integrated analysis-visualization modules, and DB import from Oracle, MS SQL.

=== NetMiner 2 (2003) ===
Improved statistical and network measures, visualization algorithms, and external data import modules.

== See also ==
- Semantic network – Knowledge base that represents semantic relations between concepts in a network
