= Organizational network analysis =

Organizational network analysis (ONA) is a method for studying communication and socio-technical networks within a formal organization. This technique creates statistical and graphical models of the people, tasks, groups, knowledge and resources of organizational systems. It is based on social network theory and more specifically, dynamic network analysis.

== Applications ==
ONA can be used in a variety of ways by managers, consultants, and executives.

=== Network visualizations ===
There are several tools that allow managers to visually depict their employee networks. Most of the tools are built specifically for researchers and academics who study Network theory, but are relatively inexpensive to use, as long as the leaders are well-versed on how to capture the information, feed it into the tool in the correct formats, and understand how to "read" and translate the network graphs into business decisions.

=== Innovation gauge ===
Several studies and research has highlighted that 'Psychological Safety' is one of the key markers for an innovative team. This has been studied and published first by Google, in their Project Aristotle work as well as highlighted in New York Times and other research publications. Amy Edmondson is one of the preeminent scholars and researchers in this field who has worked across various industries to identify the benefits and even the characteristics of 'Psychological Safety' in teams.

ONA is now increasingly being used in this context to analyze the relationships developed within a given team, and for understanding how that team works as a unit to create this psychological safety for its members. This technique is more thorough than the traditional surveys.

=== Employee engagement ===
Engagement surveys and other such culture surveys have become a mainstay of the workplace. However, one of the largest complaints from such surveys are that once managers see the results, often the aggregated sentiments of their employees, they are unsure of next steps and actions. Organizational Network Analysis, when combined with such engagement surveys, however change the way that leaders use and leverage these results. Because ONA allows managers to see the context behind the sentiments, they can actually understand how to correct or sustain these results. For example, if a company's engagement survey said 30% of the employees felt they are inadequately trained for their jobs, a manager would be perhaps inclined to either do nothing, or invest more in comprehensive training programs. However, doing an ONA alongside this might reveal to managers that employees are unhappy with training because they have limited access to institutional knowledge at the company. Then, instead of a training program, managers might simply work on ensuring their top knowledge hubs share their knowledge broadly, and have a longer, more sustainable improvement to the team's level of information and training.

== See also ==
- Social network analysis
