= LaNet-vi =

Open-source graph theory software

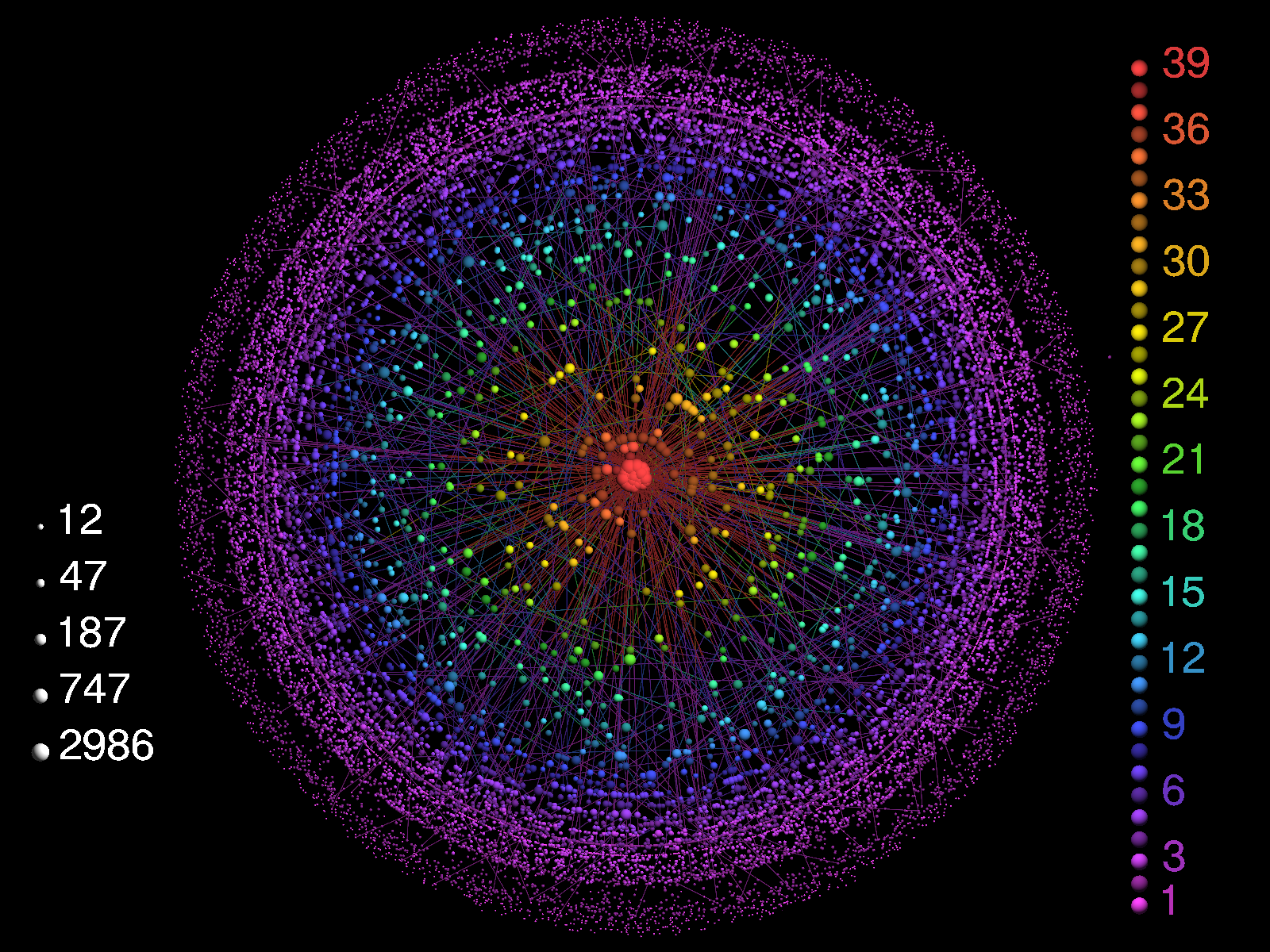
- LaNet-vi screenshot
- Developers: J.I. Alvarez-Hamelin, Alain Barrat, Alessandro Vespignani, Luca Dall'Asta, Mariano Beiró
- Stable release: 3.0.1 / January 22, 2016; 10 years ago
- Written in: C++
- Operating system: Linux, Microsoft Windows
- Size: 3.3 MB
- Type: Visualization
- License: Academic Free License (AFL), Creative Commons Licence (CCL)
- Website: http://lanet-vi.fi.uba.ar/

LaNet-vi is an open-source network visualization software. It is an acronym that stands for Large Networks visualization Tool.

LaNet-vi is based on the k-core decomposition of a network. This decomposition was introduced by Seidman in 1983 and divides the network in layers (the cores) thus providing a centrality measure for nodes. One of its main applications is the study of the Internet topology. Usually, the nodes in the highest cores of the Internet are densely connected between them, and serve as hubs for assuring the connectivity between peripheral nodes. The relationship between k-cores and connectivity has been studied by Havlin et al. and Alvarez-Hamelin et al..

The software was developed by José Ignacio Alvarez-Hamelin (University of Buenos Aires), Alain Barrat (CNRS), Alessandro Vespignani (Indiana University), Luca Dall'Asta (Politecnico di Torino) and Mariano Beiró (University of Buenos Aires). An online interface of the software is also available. This online version is being hosted and maintained by University of Buenos Aires.

In November 2010 a visualization obtained with LaNet-vi appeared in the cover of Nature Physics.
