= BioFabric =

- Developer: Institute for Systems Biology
- Stable release: 1.0.0 / 27 July 2012
- Repository: github.com/wjrl/BioFabric
- Written in: Java
- Operating system: Any (Java-based)
- License: LGPL
- Website: biofabric.org

BioFabric is an open-source software application for graph drawing. It presents graphs as a node-link diagram, but unlike other graph drawing tools that depict the nodes using discrete symbols, it represents nodes using horizontal lines.

== Rationale ==
Traditional node-link methods for visualizing networks deteriorate in terms of legibility when dealing with large networks, due to the proliferation of edge crossings amassing as what are disparagingly termed 'hairballs'. BioFabric is one of a number of alternative approaches designed explicitly to tackle this scalability issue, choosing to do so by depicting nodes as lines on the horizontal axis, one per row; edges as lines on the vertical axis, one per column, terminating at the two rows associated with the endpoint nodes. As such, nodes and edges are each provided their own dimension (as opposed to solely the edges with nodes being non-dimensional points). BioFabric exploits the additional degree of freedom thus produced to place ends of incident edges in groups. This placement can potentially carry semantic information, whereas in node-link graphics the placement is often arbitrarily generated within constraints for aesthetics, such as during force-directed graph drawing, and may result in apparently informative artifacts.

Edges are drawn (vertically) in a darker shade than (horizontal) nodes, creating visual distinction. Additional edges increase the width of the graph.

Both ends of a link are represented as a square to reinforce the above effect even at small scales. Directed graphs also incorporate arrowheads.

== Development ==
The first version, 1.0.0, was released in July 2012. Development work on BioFabric is ongoing. An open source R implementation was released in 2013, RBioFabric, for use with the igraph package, and subsequently described on the project weblog.

== Features ==
Input

- Networks can be imported using SIF files as input.

== Related work ==
Blakley et al. have described how the technique used by BioFabric, which they refer to as a cartographic representation, can be used to compare the networks A and B by juxtaposing the edges in (A \ B), (A ∩ B), and (B \ A), a technique that is evocative of a Venn diagram. Rossi and Magnani have developed ranked sociograms, which is a BioFabric-like presentation where the node ordering is based upon a ranking metric. This approach attaches semantic meaning to the length of the edge lines, and can be used to visualize the assortativity or dissortativity of a network.

== See also ==
- Graph drawing
- Systems biology
