= YEd =

Diagramming program

yEd
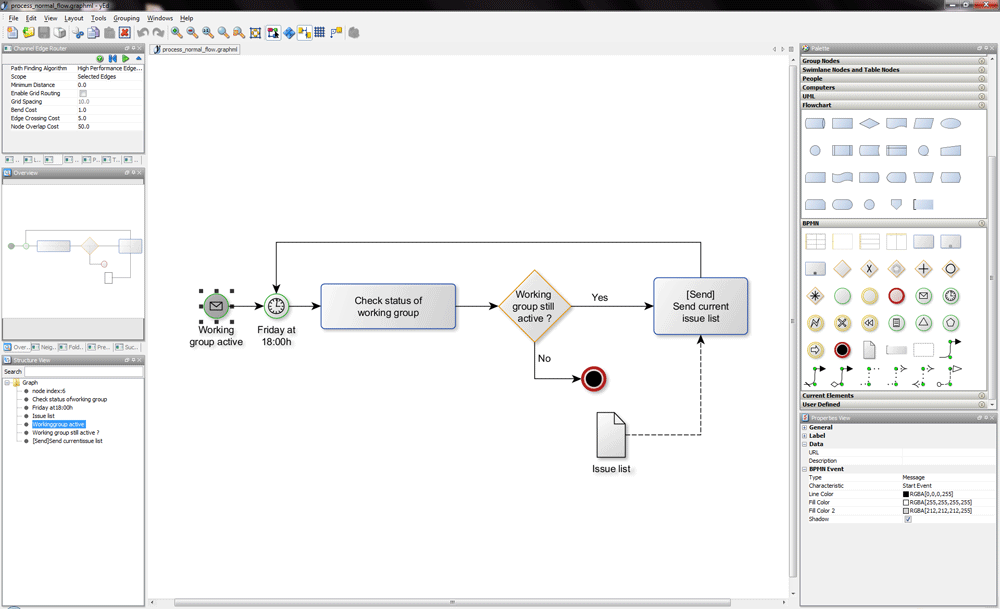
- yEd showing a BPMN diagram (process flow)
- Developer: yWorks GmbH
- Stable release: 3.24 (1 July 2024; 17 months ago) [±]
- Written in: Java
- Operating system: Cross-platform
- Standard: GraphML
- Type: Diagramming software
- License: Freeware
- Website: www.yworks.com/yed

yEd is a general-purpose diagramming program with a multi-document interface.

It is a cross-platform application written in Java that runs on Windows, Linux, Mac OS, and other platforms that support the Java Virtual Machine.

It is released under a proprietary software license, that allows using a single copy gratis.

An online version of yEd, yEd Live, also exists, and there is a Confluence version of yEd, Graphity for Confluence.

yEd can be used to draw many different types of diagrams, including flowcharts, network diagrams, UMLs, BPMN, mind maps, organization charts, and entity-relationship diagrams. yEd also allows the use of custom vector and raster graphics as diagram elements.

yEd loads and saves diagrams from/to GraphML, an XML-based format. It can also print very large diagrams that span multiple pages.

== Features ==
=== Automatic layout ===
yEd can automatically arrange diagram elements using a variety of graph layout algorithms, including force-based layout, hierarchical layout (for flowcharts), orthogonal layout (for UML class diagrams), and tree layout (for organization charts).

=== Data exchange ===
yEd can import data in various formats to generate diagrams out of it. Import formats include the Microsoft Excel .xls format for spreadsheet data, the Gedcom format for genealogical data, and also arbitrary XML-based file formats, which are transformed by means of XSLT stylesheets. Predefined XSLT stylesheets provided by yEd can process the Apache Ant build script format used to define dependency information in software build processes and the OWL file format for the description of ontologies. Other XML-based data is processed in a generic way.

yEd can export diagrams to various raster and vector formats, including GIF, JPEG, PNG, EMF, BMP, PDF, EPS, and SVG. It can also export to SWF (Shockwave Flash) file format and HTML image maps.

The structural information of a diagram can be exported as GML (Graph Modeling Language) and TGF (Trivial Graph Format).

== Development ==
yEd is a product of yWorks GmbH, a German software company.

== See also ==
- List of UML tools
