= Tiago P. Peixoto =

Brazilian physicist

Tiago de Paula Peixoto
- Born: Brazil
- Education: University of São Paulo
- Known for: graph-tool
- Awards: Erdős–Rényi Prize
- Scientific career
- Fields: Statistical Physics, Complex Systems, Network Science
- Workplaces: University of Bath (2016 - 2019) and Central European University (2019 - 2024), Interdisciplinary Transformation University (2024 - 2026), Goethe University Frankfurt (2026 - now)
- Thesis: PhD: "Dynamics of the epicenters of the Olami-Feder-Christensen model of earthquakes (OFC)" (2007), Habilitation: "Large-scale structures in networks: generative models, statistical inference, function and evolution" (2017)
- Doctoral advisors: Carmen Pimentel Cintra do Prado
- Website: https://skewed.de/lab

Tiago de Paula Peixoto is a Brazilian physicist who works in the areas of network science, statistical physics, and complex systems. He is currently an full professor of Complex Systems and Network Science at the Goethe University Frankfurt.

== Career ==
Peixoto is mostly known for his work in statistical inference in networks. He developed and maintains the graph manipulation library graph-tool, which contains readily available implementations of the methods he proposes in his publications.

Peixoto graduated with a bachelor's degree in physics from the University of São Paulo in 2003. He earned a PhD in Physics from the same university in 2007, advised by Carmen Pimentel Cintra do Prado with a dissertation entitled "Dynamics of the epicenters of the Olami-Feder-Christensen model of earthquakes (OFC)". In 2017 he obtained his Habilitation in Theoretical Physics at the University of Bremen.

Peixoto worked as a post-doctoral fellow in Germany (2008–2016) at the Technische Universität Darmstadt and University of Bremen before becoming an assistant professor (lecturer), in 2016, at the Department of Mathematics of the University of Bath. In 2019, he joined the faculty of the Central European University as an associate professor. In 2024, he became full professor at the Interdisciplinary Transformation University in Linz, Austria. As of 2026 he is full professor at the Goethe University Frankfurt.

== Awards and honors ==
In 2019, Peixoto was awarded the prestigious Erdős–Rényi Prize in Network Science for his contributions for the statistical inference of network modules (aka communities), statistical analysis and network visualization. He was also the sixth recipient of the Zachary Karate Club CLUB prize.
