= Meta model (disambiguation) =

A meta model is used in metamodeling for software engineering.

Meta model may also refer to:

- MODAF Meta-Model
- Surrogate model, an approximating model in computer simulation
