= TRAK =

Enterprise architecture framework

TRAK is a general architecture framework aimed at systems engineers. TRAK provides a set of triples and defines architecture view content to support description of a system of interest. It is based on MODAF 1.2.

== History ==
TRAK was originally commissioned by London Underground Limited. Development started in 2009 and was based on the then current views of architectural description within London Underground which were based on ISO/IEC 42010 and tied to the systems engineering life cycle defined in ISO/IEC 15288.

Although the original intent was to develop a rail-specific architecture framework, in adapting MODAF to suit local needs any defence or domain-specific content was removed. The result was a domain-free metamodel with architecture viewpoints that were only based on representing complex systems.

TRAK was released under open source licenses in February 2010.

It has been formally adopted by the UK Department for Transport who chair the TRAK Steering Group that manages the overall direction, strategy and formal releases of TRAK.

The TRAK development team received a Working Group award. (photo on the INCOSE Transportation Working Group page). TRAK was a finalist for the 2011 IET Innovation Awards.

== Terminology ==
Architecture Description Element
An individual architecture description object that is used to describe or represent an item of real-world architecture. An architecture description element can appear in an architecture description. Only Architecture Description Elements are used to form TRAK Architecture Views. An Architecture Description Element may be a node element or a connector element. A connector element and either two node elements are used to form an Architecture Description Tuple.

Architecture Description Tuple
A named architecture description element connected by a named relationship to a named architecture description element. i.e. subject – predicate object – the basis of a sentence. e.g. Organisation A 'has part' Job B. It follows the natural language construct of Subject – Predicate – Object – also used in RDF. See Tuple. TRAK requires each tuple to be explicit. The Architecture Description Tuples are defined by the TRAK Metamodel. There are at least 950 Architecture Description Triples or assertions provided by the TRAK metamodel.. An Architecture Description Tuple is the smallest unit of architecture description.

Master Architecture View
Each TRAK metamodel node has a master architecture view. Within an architecture description or model each element (individual) has to be created and shown on its master architecture view before it can be used on any other architecture view. For example, before describing functions using, say, 'System performs Function' on a SV-04 Solution Function View the System element would be first created and presented on a TRAK SV-01 Solution Structure View.

Perspective
ISO/IEC 42010:2007 refers to an Architectural Perspective as 'Sharing of architectural models also facilitates an "aspect-oriented" style of architectural description' A grouping of related and overlapping architectural views.

(Architecture) View
ISO/IEC 42010 refers to an architecture view as 'work product expressing the architecture of a system from the perspective of specific system concerns'. A TRAK architecture view is defined as an Architecture Product in the TRAK metamodel. A TRAK architecture view presents a set of Architecture Description Tuples in accordance with its governing viewpoint.

(Architecture) Viewpoint
ISO/IEC 42010:2007 – An architecture viewpoint defines a set of conventions (notations, languages and model types) for constructing a certain kind of view. In TRAK an architecture viewpoint is a specification for a single TRAK architecture view. Each TRAK Architecture Viewpoint defines both the allowed content and the minimum acceptable architecture view content as sets of Architecture Description Tuples.

== TRAK structure ==
TRAK is defined in a logical way – that is to say free of any notion of how TRAK is implemented in any tool or any architecture description language.

TRAK has 24 architecture viewpoints which are grouped into 5 perspectives. Each viewpoint belongs to a single perspective and specifies a single view (type). Each viewpoint specifies what sets of types of architectural description element and relationships (tuples) can appear. The architectural description element types and relationships are specified by the TRAK metamodel.

A description of the structure of the TRAK architecture framework in terms of its relationships with the 3 SourceForge projects, the metamodel, the architecture viewpoints, the architecture views and architecture description tuples

The logical definition of TRAK consists of 3 documents, each of which is an open source project on SourceForge:

- TRAK00004. TRAK. Architecture Framework. document. This controls TRAK as a whole. It defines the TRAK Architecture Perspectives, colours, by-laws (rules affecting the design of TRAK), architecture views and architecture descriptions, minimal modelling process.
- TRAK00001. TRAK. Architecture Framework. Architecture Viewpoints document. This defines the TRAK architecture viewpoints.
- TRAK00002. TRAK. Architecture Framework. Metamodel document. This defines the architecture description elements that can appear in a viewpoint definition.

== TRAK architecture perspectives ==
TRAK has 5 architecture perspectives, each of which groups together architecture viewpoints and views of an overlapping subject area:

- Enterprise Perspective
- Concept Perspective
- Procurement Perspective
- Solution Perspective
- Management Perspective

=== Enterprise perspective ===
This perspective covers the enduring capabilities that are needed as part of the bigger enterprise. These are high level needs that everything else contributes to and form part of the long-term strategic objectives that need to be managed.

=== Concept perspective ===
The concept perspective covers the logical view of what is needed in response to the capabilities required by the enterprise in the enterprise perspective. It covers the logical connection of nodes, for example a service control centre, to other nodes with no recognition of how this might be realised either by organisation or technology. It also implies no particular part of a life cycle – it covers everything from concept to disposal ("lust to dust"!).

=== Procurement perspective ===
The procurement perspective provides a top level view of the solution to the enterprise capability needs outlined in the enterprise perspective and developed in the concept perspective. It provides a way of showing how projects deliver the solutions described in the solution perspective to provide capability. It provides a way of describing time dependency between projects and is an essential for investigating capability gaps.

=== Solution perspective ===
The solution perspective provides architecture views describing the solution – whether proposed or realised. It covers the parts of 'systems' whether human or machine, their exchanges and protocols. The solution perspective describes how organisations and equipment are organised and governed. The solution perspective describes how the logical requirements outlined in the concept perspective are realised and shows how the solution(s) realise the capability needed by the enterprise and described in the enterprise perspective.

=== Management perspective ===
The management perspective provides architecture views that describe the architectural task and those relationships that are common across other perspectives. It provides ways of defining the scope and findings of the architectural task – structuring the approach and modelling.

The management perspective provides ways of describing the normative standards that apply. It contains architecture views that provide supporting information to aid the portability and understanding of the model(s).

== The TRAK metamodel ==
Metamodel for the TRAK architecture framework. Shows general elements for use in TRAK architecture views.

Metamodel for the TRAK architecture framework. Shows elements for use in TRAK architecture views describing safety and security.

Metamodel for the TRAK architecture framework. Shows elements that define the structure of TRAK itself.

Metamodel for the TRAK architecture framework. Shows elements used to define TRAK architecture viewpoints and the allowed content of TRAK architecture views.

The TRAK metamodel is shown below. Note that this is not a controlled copy.

The TRAK metamodel has 53 node elements, 79 connector elements, 118 properties and 101 enumerated property values. The combination of node and connector elements defines c 950 triples forming assertions to describe real world architecture and which may be presented by one or more TRAK architecture views if allowed by the respective architecture viewpoints.

There is an ontology description of the TRAK metamodel elements using RDF at. This is also presented as small set of HTML pages. The ontology description only describes the meaning individual elements with respect to other vocabularies not the triples defining the metamodel.

== TRAK Differences vs MODAF 1.2.003 ==
The TRAK Metamodel specification both simplifies and extends the basic concepts within the MODAF 1.2 metamodel. It has removed and redefined stereotypes and any defence-specific constructs have been removed. The TRAK Metamodel specification contains a comparison of the TRAK metamodel at initial release against MODAF 1.2.003. This is also outlined separately.

Significant changes vs MODAF include:

- the TRAK metamodel is aimed at users (the MODAF M3 is an abstract UML profile intended as a specification for tool vendors to implement MODAF – there is no metamodel for users only fragments of 'simplified metamodel' which aim to represent the more complicated M3). In TRAK the metamodel shown is the master one.
- The System element is central to TRAK and can represent hard systems and soft systems (in MODAF 1.2.003 System is an artefact and part of the Physical Architecture and cannot include non physical parts )
- TRAK can represent any type of interface exchange / flow – information, energy or resource
- TRAK can represent exchange characteristics associated with human resources – Organisations, Jobs and Roles
- TRAK includes means to represent requirements through the Standard (document/collection) and Requirement (atomic) metamodel elements and enforced by Contract
- TRAK includes the means to plan and describe the architecture task and architecture description and its organisation as a view (MV-02 Architecture Description Design Record)
- other types of dependency and associations can be represented – physical, membership, responsibility extent
- TRAK includes the means to describe assurance cases (including design verification) using the Claim – Argument – Evidence construct
- TRAK includes the means to describe safety / security – threats/hazards, vulnerabilities, mitigations and risk and causes / impacts
- TRAK includes n-ary triples where the object of a triple is itself another triple. This includes 'Claim about Architecture Description Tuple'. The MV-04 Assurance architecture view uses 'Claim about (Architecture Description Element satisfies Contract / Requirement/ Standard)' and 'Claim about (Contract / Requirement/ Standard governs Architecture Description Element)' to describe claims of conformance
  Example of an n-ary triple where the object of a triple is another triple e.g. 'Claim about ('Software satisfies Standard')'
  . The 'Event caused by (Event AND / OR / NOT Event)' triples form the basis for describing a fault tree using the SV-11 Solution Event Causes architecture view.
- addition of ISO/IEC 42010 concepts to represent the architectural task, architecture description and architecture views – to allow a description of the task scope, purpose, findings
- addition of consistency rules for content that apply to the entire collection of views and context to improve navigation and visibility of content
- rules that constrain how and in what order relationships can be made to improve the consistency of the set of views that forms the architecture description

Structurally there are other changes:

- TRAK has 24 viewpoints (vs c 47 views in MODAF)
- the each TRAK architecture view content is defined in its respective architecture viewpoint using tuples (a node – relationship – node element construct i.e. a triple or 1, tuple ) and has allowed and minimum acceptable content and correspondence rules with respect to other architecture views within the architecture description because this is needed to specify a uniquely addressable path in a metamodel (specifying a block metamodel element is not sufficient on its own where there are several relationships involving the element).
- Since ISO/IEC/IEEE 42010:2011 defines architecture in terms of the relationship of a system to its environment the smallest unit of architecture description that may appear in a TRAK architecture view is therefore the Architecture Description Tuple i.e. node – relationship – node.

The way in which TRAK is managed and released via a set of open source projects is also quite different from other architecture frameworks. All change requests and feature requests and the sentencing of them are fully visible to anyone, not restricted to those who specify or develop the framework. Releases are under change control and all history is maintained by versioning software (Subversion (SVN)).

== ISO 42010 considerations ==
TRAK applies ISO/IEC 42010 in the following ways:-

- an architecture description is a response to a task which addresses a stakeholder's concerns (this is addressed using the TRAK::MVp-02 Architecture Description Design Record Viewpoint against which a view can be produced to define the task, concerns addressed and findings)
- each TRAK architecture view is specified by an architecture viewpoint within the TRAK architecture framework. For example, the MVp-04 Assurance architecture viewpoint specifies the content of any MV-04 assurance architecture view.
- each TRAK architecture viewpoint identifies the stakeholders, concerns addressed, anti-concerns (things the architecture viewpoint is not to be used for), the metamodel tuples needed, the metamodel tuples allowed, well-formedness (minimum acceptable content) and consistency rules with other views within the architecture description e.g. in a MV-04 Assurance architecture view before 'Evidence proves Claim' can be asserted there has to exist 'Evidence supports Argument supports (same) Claim'
- correspondence rules are defined by architecture viewpoints and for an architecture description using the TRAK metamodel. Rules are defined using triples from the TRAK metamodel.

An overall comparison between TRAK and ISO/IEC 42010 is made in the TRAK Architecture Framework document. A more detailed compliance assessment against the 2011 version of the standard is made separately and is viewable as a set of web pages. These, together with a compliance matrix, compare:-

1. TRAK as an architecture framework against the requirements of section 6.1 (Architecture Frameworks) of ISO/IEC/IEEE 42010:2011 and;
2. a TRAK-conforming architecture description against section 5 (Architecture Descriptions) of ISO/IEC/IEEE 42010:2011.

== Defining architecture viewpoints and specifying architecture view content ==
In accordance with ISO/IEC/IEEE 42010 each TRAK architecture viewpoint is a specification against which each TRAK architecture view is prepared and interpreted. Each TRAK architecture view presents one or more Architecture Description Tuples as permitted by its governing architecture viewpoint. The presented content (triples) addresses the concerns framed by the governing architecture viewpoint.

The minimum unit of architecture description is a triple since this always forms a statement or assertion about the real world thing being described.

A triple is formed from a subject, a predicate and an object

This therefore also forms the basis of the definition of the allowed content of each TRAK architecture view. Triples are the only means to uniquely specify allowed content from a metamodel.

Only a triple can uniquely specify a path in a metamodel

If the allowed content of an architecture view does not overlap that of any other architecture view it is impossible to navigate between architecture views in an architecture description. If the overlap in allowed content between any pair of architecture views is too great it becomes impossible to differentiate one from the other and understand the purpose of each - they are not distinct. Each architecture viewpoint definition needs to provide sufficient overlap to support navigation whilst remaining distinct. This is managed in TRAK using a graph model of TRAK and a non-TRAK architecture viewpoint for architecture viewpoint definition. Core subject matter that addresses the concerns framed by the architecture viewpoint is represented differently to triples that provide optional additional context. The Neo4J graph model provides the means to assess the overlap between TRAK architecture views and ensure that the TRAK metamodel is covered by the set of TRAK architecture viewpoint definitions.

The allowed architecture view content does not overlap any other architecture view - navigation between the two is impossible

Allowed Architecture View Content Definitions Must Overlap - A Bit

The allowed architecture view content overlaps that of another architecture view too much - indistinct purpose

== TRAK architecture viewpoints and views ==
The content, presentation and interpretation of each TRAK architecture view is specified by a corresponding architecture viewpoint. Every TRAK architecture viewpoint is designated using a 'p' in the numbering e.g. a CVp-01 is the architecture viewpoint that specifies a CV-01 architecture view.

In general use if there is a risk of confusion with a similarly numbered architecture view in another architecture framework such as DODAF or MODAF then a namespace prefix is used e.g. TRAK::SV-01

TRAK defines 24 architecture viewpoints (by comparison DODAF 2.0 has 52 views/models, MODAF 1.2.004 has 47 views and NAF 3.1 has 49 subviews)

- Enterprise Perspective
  - EVp-01 Enterprise Goal
  - EVp-02 Capability Hierarchy
  - EVp-03 Capability Phasing
- Concept Perspective
  - CVp-01 Concept Need
  - CVp-03 Concept Item Exchange
  - CVp-04 Concept Activity to Capability Mapping
  - CVp-05 Concept Activity
  - CVp-06 Concept Sequence
- Procurement Perspective
  - PrVp-01 Procurement Structure
  - PrVp-02 Procurement Timeline
  - PrVp-03 Procurement Responsibility
- Solution Perspective
  - SVp-01 Solution Structure
  - SVp-02 Solution Resource Interaction
  - SVp-03 Solution Resource Interaction to Function Mapping
  - SVp-04 Solution Function
  - SVp-05 Solution Function to Concept Activity Mapping
  - SVp-06 Solution Competence
  - SVp-07 Solution Sequence
  - SVp-11 Solution Event Causes
  - SVp-13 Solution Risk
- Management Perspective
  - MVp-01 Architecture Description Dictionary
  - MVp-02 Architecture Description Design Record
  - MVp-03 Requirements & Standards
  - MVp-04 Assurance

These defined in the TRAK Architecture Viewpoints specification.

== Presentation of TRAK architecture views ==
TRAK does not specify a notation or presentation language (architecture description language in ISO/IEC 42010 terminology) in which to present the architecture views. TRAK architecture descriptions are not therefore UML, SysML or BPMN models although any of these notations can be used to prepare at least some of the views (an ADL might not contain the necessary concepts/stereotypes or might not allow them to be connected in the way needed to represent a TRAK architecture view).

TRAK requires the metamodel element name of every architecture description element in a TRAK architecture view to be explicitly shown so that each TRAK view can be read as a set of declarative statements e.g.

- 'System. A -is configured with-> Software. B'
- 'Claim. System A meets the requirement to ... -about-> Standard. Climatic Environmental Specification.'
- 'Physical. Shield Building -has-> Vulnerability. Structural Weakness <-exploits- Threat. Deliberate Aircraft Impact'

Tuples can be presented using nodes and relationships with directions (a directed graph).

Example TRAK SV-13 Solution Risk View Presented as a Graph Showing Tuples from the TRAK Metamodel

TRAK also allows a view to be constructed from textual statements formed from one or more triples. Since a TRAK view is a set of tuples / triples it is possible to use a graph or a set of RDF triples to present a TRAK view.

# example TRAK SV-13 Solution Risk architecture view
@prefix trak:<https://purl.org/trak/metamodel/vocab/#> .
@prefix rdf:<http://www.w3.org/1999/02/22-rdf-syntax-ns#> .
@prefix xsd:<https://www.w3.org/2001/XMLSchema#> .
@prefix ad:<http://ad_base_uri#> .

# describe Resources
 ad:res_shbldg a trak:Physical;
	trak:name "Shield Building"@en;
 	trak:exposed_to ad:rsk_rad;
	trak:has ad:vul_st_weak.

# describe Vulnerabilities
 ad:vul_st_weak a trak:Vulnerability;
	trak:name "Structural Weakness"@en;
	trak:results_in ad:rsk_rad.

ad:vul_st_foun a trak:Vulnerability;
	trak:name "Foundations Inadequate"@en;
	trak:contributes_to ad:vul_st_weak.

ad:vul_st_clad a trak:Vulnerability;
	trak:name "Cladding Not to Specification"@en;
	trak:contributes_to ad:vul_st_weak.

# describe Threat
ad:thr_impact a trak:Threat;
 	trak:name "Deliberate Aircraft Impact"@en;
 	trak:exploits ad:vul_st_weak;
	trak:poses ad:rsk_rad;
	trak:to ad:res_shbldg.

# describe Risk
ad:rsk_rad a trak:Risk;
	trak:name "Release of Radioactive Material to the Material World"@en;
	trak:impact_severity_ranking trak:High;
	trak:likelihood "0.000034"^^xsd:decimal.

TRAK SV-13 Solution Risk View presented using Turtle

A RDF ontology description of the TRAK metamodel elements is being developed. This takes the definitions of the elements from the TRAK Metamodel specification output from a graph model of TRAK within a Neo4J graph database. A TRAK architecture view consisting of RDF triples can be linked to the RDF TRAK metamodel ontology to form a knowledge graph. Each triple in a TRAK architecture view represents a fact or assertion.

TRAK also requires every block and every connector to have a name and for these to be visible (explicit). The intent of this is to ensure that every assertion formed by a triple is visible; that a TRAK architecture view can be read as the author of the view meant it and improve semantic consistency. Presentation rules that apply to all TRAK architecture views are specified in the overall TRAK specification (as 'Bye Laws').

TRAK is a logical definition – it specifies what needs to be shown and minimum acceptable content but does not mandate how you achieve it. TRAK simply defines the node and connector elements and the allowed combinations (triples) that must / may appear in each architecture view. The allowed core content presented by a TRAK architecture view addresses the concerns of the governing architecture viewpoint. It does not specify or mandate any particular notation or language. For example, a simple block and connector diagram (as above) is acceptable as is a set of plain text statements, a diagram using the UML, a graph or a set of RDF triples. For the same reason TRAK architecture view content is specified using an abstract and different notation from any notation that might be used to implement a TRAK architecture view to avoid a common fault arising from a fault in a single notation affecting both the TRAK architecture viewpoint content definition and the 'design response' – the content of a particular TRAK architecture view.

== Creating an architecture description using TRAK ==
TRAK itself does not mandate process. There is an element of process introduced, however, because TRAK adheres to ISO/IEC 42010 which states that an architecture description is produced in response to a task and the task stakeholder concerns and also because TRAK has master architecture views which creates dependencies between views and results in minimum allowed architecture view sets.

This gives rise to a minimal process which is:

- identify the task stakeholder and their concerns
- using the TRAK00001 TRAK Architecture Viewpoints specification, select the architecture viewpoints needed to address the stakeholder concerns
- develop architecture views, that conform to these architecture viewpoints, that address these concerns
- these in turn may require additional architecture views to be prepared to form a legitimate allowed architecture view set
- document the purpose, concerns, findings and the architecture description using a MV-02 Architecture Design Record View supplemented by a MV-01 Architecture Dictionary View

== Licensing ==
TRAK is released under 2 forms of open source license:

- GNU Free Documentation License (GFDL) for the logical definition – TRAK Overall, TRAK Metamodel and TRAK Viewpoints documents
- GNU General Public License (GPL) for implementations of TRAK – UML profile for TRAK for general UML modelling tools and TRAK MDG Technology for Sparx Systems Enterprise Architect modelling tool.

== Tool support ==
TRAK supports modelling tools through the following mechanisms:

- a UML profile and SysML profile for TRAK – for use with any UML modelling tool that can import a UML profile
- a central RDF/XML ontology description of the semantics of TRAK metamodel node, connector and property elements at https://purl.org/trak/elements/# to support TRAK architecture descriptions using RDF and Turtle
- a MDG plugin for Sparx Systems Enterprise Architect - mdgfortrak - based on the UML and SysML profiles for TRAK. Released as open source on SourceForge. This provides an ability to create TRAK architecture views using the UML or the SysML.
- a MDG plugin for Sparx Systems Enterprise Architect and UML + SysML profile that provide the ability to annotate UML and SysML Use Case and State Machine diagrams with TRAK metamodel elements used to describe requirements, standards and traceability - umlsysmlwithtrak
- a template for MooD International's MooD 2010 software platform (developed by Vega Consulting Services Ltd – part of Leonardo). Released as open source on SourceForge.
- a stencil for OmniGraffle (Mac OS X, iPad). Released as open source on SourceForge.
- a template for Microsoft Visio. Released as open source on SourceForge.

A comparison of the stereotype (concepts) in the UML against those in the TRAK Metamodel provides an analysis, for the UML Profile for TRAK, what TRAK Viewpoints and therefore TRAK Views UML is able to represent fully, partially and not at all. This is a consequence of the constructs available in UML and the particular implementation in the UML Profile for TRAK and arises because different architecture description languages (ADLs) are often design for different purposes and sometimes different domains i.e. in ISO/IEC 42010 the concerns they address are different from those that the architecture framework, in this case TRAK, does.

As tools represent an implementation of the logical definition of TRAK they may contain limitations or errors owing to the notation language (architecture description language) used and tool-specific capabilities.

== Examples of architecture description using TRAK ==
- Sub Surface Upgrade Programme (SSUP). Upgrade of signalling and rolling stock for Circle, Hammersmith, Metropolitan and District lines on London Underground. Cited in Rail Value for Money Study. Whole System Programme Management Report. 25 May 2011.
- Technical Strategy Leadership Group (TSLG). Railway Functional Architecture
- Rail Safety & Standards Board (RSSB). UK Railway Functional Architecture. Ongoing research – RSSB Research & Development E-newsletter. Issue 66. Oct. 2010. Justification for the selection/use of TRAK is provided in the summary report for the task. The T912 railway functional architecture project is described separately. The Railway Functional Architecture is made available as a set of HTML pages.
- University of Birmingham. InfraGuidER (Infrastructure Guidelines for Environmental Railway Performance) deliverables 9 and 18., minutes: D22: 2nd Workshop for EURNEX (European Rail Research Network of Excellence) poles of excellences
- Integrated EA 2011. Managing Risk and Cost with an EA Approach. Mike Brownsword (Atego) & Joe Silmon (Centre for Railway Research and Education).,
- An architecture description describing the claims of compliance of TRAK as an architecture framework and a TRAK-conforming architecture description against the requirements of ISO/IEC/IEEE 42010:2011. Includes examples of the following views: MV-02 Architecture Description Design Record, MV-03 Requirements and Standards and MV-04 Assurance. The underlying model was then used to produce the compliance matrix as an example of model-based systems engineering.
