= OneGeology =

OneGeology is an international collaborative project in the field of geology supported by 118 countries, UNESCO, and major global geoscience bodies. It is an International Year of Planet Earth flagship initiative that aims to enable online access to dynamic digital geological map of the world for everyone. The project uses the GeoSciML markup language and initially targets a scale of approximately 1:1 million. Downstream uses could be to identify areas suitable for mining, oil and gas exploration or areas at risk from landslides or earthquakes, to help understanding of formations which store groundwater for drinking or irrigation, and to help locate porous rocks suitable for burying emissions of greenhouse gases. The project portal was launched on August 6, 2008, at the 33rd International Geological Congress (IGC) in Oslo, Norway.

== See also ==
- Systems geology
