= NCOW =

Net-Centric Operations Warfare (also referred to as NCOW, NCOW-RM, or Net-Centric Operations Warfare Reference Model ) describes how the United States Department of Defense will conduct business operations, warfare, and enterprise management in the future. It is based on the information technology (IT) concept of an assured, dynamic, and shared information environment that provides access to trusted information for all users, based on need, independent of time and place. NCOW is an information-enabled concept of operations that generates increased combat power by networking sensors, decision makers, and shooters. This enables shared awareness, increased speed of command, higher tempo of operations, greater lethality, increased survivability, and a degree of self-synchronization. In essence, network-centric warfare translates information superiority into combat power by effectively linking knowledgeable entities in the battlespace.

NCOW is the result of a long history of United States Department of Defense systems acquisition where each acquisition program independently developed redundant and incompatible systems. These weaknesses were identified in a number of Government Accountability Office audits and prompted the passage of the Clinger-Cohen Act, establishment of the Global Information Grid, and establishment of the DoD Architecture Framework as a part of the business transformation mission of the Department of Defense. The net-centric model is the overarching enterprise architecture for information technology systems within DoD.

== See also ==
- Network-centric warfare
- DODAF - Architectural framework used to describe and plan NCOW systems
- Network Simulator
