= Logical model =

Logical model can refer to:

- A model in logic, see model theory
- In computer science a logical data model
