= International Year of Planet Earth =

International year designated by the United Nations

The United Nations General Assembly declared 2008 as the International Year of Planet Earth to increase awareness of the importance of Earth sciences for the advancement of sustainable development. UNESCO was designated as the lead agency. The Year's activities spanned the three years 2006–2009.

== Goals ==
The Year aimed to raise $20 million from industry and governments, of which half was to be spent on co-funding research, and half on "outreach" activities. It was intended to be the biggest ever international effort to promote the Earth sciences.

Apart from researchers, who were expected to benefit under the Year's Science Programme, the principal target groups for the Year's broader messages were:

- Decision makers and politicians, to better inform them about the how Earth scientific knowledge can be used for sustainable development
- The voting public, to communicate to them how Earth scientific knowledge can contribute to a better society
- Geoscientists, to help them use their knowledge of various aspects of the Earth for the benefit of the world’s population.

The research themes of the year, set out in ten science prospectuses, were chosen for their societal relevance, multidisciplinary nature, and outreach potential. The Year had twelve founding partners, 23 associate partners, and was backed politically by 97 countries representing 87% of the world’s population. The Year was promoted politically at UNESCO and at the United Nations in New York by the People’s Republic of Tanzania.

The Year encouraged contributions from researchers within ten separate themes. The outreach programme worked in a similar way, receiving bids for support from individuals and organisations worldwide.

The Year's Project Leader was former IUGS President Professor Eduardo F J de Mulder. The Year's Science Committee was chaired by Professor Edward Derbyshire (Royal Holloway) and its Outreach Committee by Dr Ted Nield (Geological Society of London).

The International Year of Planet Earth project was initiated jointly by the International Union of Geological Sciences (IUGS) and the United Nations Educational Scientific and Cultural Organisation (UNESCO). The UN press release reads:

By a draft on the International Year of Planet Earth, 2008, which the Committee approved without a vote on 11 November, the Assembly would declare 2008 the International Year of Planet Earth. It would also designate the United Nations Educational, Scientific and Cultural Organization (UNESCO) to organize activities to be undertaken during the Year, in collaboration with UNEP and other relevant United Nations bodies, the International Union of Geological Sciences and other Earth sciences societies and groups throughout the world. Also by that draft, the Assembly would encourage Member States, the United Nations system and other actors to use the Year to increase awareness of the importance of Earth sciences in achieving sustainable development and promoting local, national, regional and international action.

== Background ==
The project was backed by the following founding partners:

- International Union of Geodesy and Geophysics (IUGG)
- International Geographical Union
- International Union of Soil Sciences (IUSS)
- International Lithosphere Programme (ILP)
- National Geological Survey of the Netherlands (NITG-TNO)
- Geological Society of London
- International Soil Reference and Information Centre (ISRIC)
- A consortium of the International Association for Engineering Geology and the Environment (IAEG)
- International Society for Rock Mechanics (ISRM)
- International Society of Soil Mechanics and Geotechnical Engineering (ISSMGE)
- International Union for Quaternary Research (INQUA)
- American Geological Institute (AGI)
- American Association of Petroleum Geologists (AAPG)
- American Institute of Professional Geologists (AIPG)

The Year was also supported by 23 Associate Partners, including all major international geoscientific and other relevant organisations:

- International Council for Science (ICSU)
- Intergovernmental Oceanographic Commission of UNESCO (IOC)
- International Permafrost Association (IPA)
- International Association on the Genesis of Ore Deposits (IAGOD)
- Society of Economic Geologists (SEG)
- Society for Geology Applied to Mineral Deposits (SGA)
- International Association of Hydrogeologists (IAH)
- International Geoscience Programme (IGCP)
- European Federation of Geoscientists (EFG)
- African Association of Remote Sensing of the Environment (AARSE)
- Science Council of Asia (SCA)
- European Association for the Conservation of the Geological Heritage (ProGEO)
- Society for Sedimentary Geology (SEPM)
- Coordinating Committee for Geoscience Programmes in East and Southeast Asia (CCOP)
- Geological Society of Africa (GSAf)
- United Nations University (UNU)
- Association of Geoscientists for International Development (AGID)
- United Nations International Strategy for Disaster Reduction (UN/ISDR)
- North-eastern Science Foundation (USA) (NESF)
- Association of American State Geologists (AASG)
- International Society of Photogrammetry and Remote Sensing (ISPRS)
- Geological Society of America (GSA)
- North American Committee for Stratigraphic Nomenclature (NACSN)

== Objectives ==
The Year's stated objective was to:

Reduce risks for society caused by natural and human-induced hazards, reduce health problems by improving understanding of the medical aspects of Earth science, discover new natural resources and make them available in a sustainable manner, build safer structures and expand urban areas, utilizing natural subsurface conditions, determine the non-human factor in climatic change, enhance understanding of the occurrence of natural resources so as to contribute to efforts to reduce political tension, detect deep and poorly accessible groundwater resources, improve understanding of the evolution of life, increase interest in the Earth sciences in society at large, encourage more young people to study Earth science in university.

== Themes ==
Research themes for the Year included:

- Groundwater: reservoir for a thirsty planet?
- Hazards: minimizing risk, maximizing awareness
- Earth and Health: building a safer environment
- Climate change: the ‘stone tape’
- Resource Issues: towards sustainable use
- Megacities: going deeper, building safer
- Deep Earth: from crust to core
- Ocean: abyss of time
- Soil: Earth’s living skin
- Earth and Life: origins of diversity

== Output and legacy ==
As part of the IYPE legacy, 80 National and Regional IYPE Committees were set up to bring together key figures from various organisations into a single campaign dedicated to raising awareness of the Earth sciences among decision makers and the public.

The Young Earth-Science Initiative (YES) was also created, providing a platform for young professionals in the Earth sciences. Initiated by two Italian geoscientists, David Govoni and Luca Micucci, it started in 2007 and grew rapidly at the Global Launch Event of the IYPE in Paris in 2008, during which many young geoscientists were invited to participate. From there, the YES Initiative expanded, eventually adopting a formal structure, a network of supporting organisations (including IYPE) and an invitation by the Chinese government to host the first International YES Conference in October 2009 in Beijing.

An international collaborative project known as OneGeology was launched, aiming to bring together geological data from all nations into a digital database and thus transform them into a single computer language, providing free access to the online digital geological world map in the scale of 1:1 million. That initiative, spearheaded by Ian Jackson of the British Geological Survey, came under the IYPE banner in 2007.

== See also ==
- International Geophysical Year
- Scientific opinion on climate change
- United Nations International Years
