= Ontology Definition MetaModel =

Object Management Group specification

The Ontology Definition MetaModel (ODM) is an Object Management Group (OMG) specification to make the concepts of Model-Driven Architecture applicable to the engineering of ontologies. Hence, it links Common Logic (CL), the Web Ontology Language (OWL), and the Resource Description Framework (RDF).

OWL and RDF were initially defined to provide an XML-based machine to machine interchange of metadata and semantics. ODM now integrates these into visual modeling, giving a standard well-defined process for modeling the ontology, as well as, allowing for interoperability with other modeling based on languages like UML, SysML and UPDM.

== See also ==
- Web Ontology Language
- Unified Modeling Language

== Resources ==
- Eclipse ODM
- Enterprise Architect ODM MDG Technology
- Formal Modelling, Knowledge Representation and Reasoning for Design and Development of User-centric Pervasive Software: A Meta-review, article in International Journal of Metadata, Semantics and Ontologies, Vol 6, No 2 (2011), 96-125, by Ahmet Soylu, Patrick De Causmaecker, Davy Preuveneers, Yolande Berbers, and Piet Desmet
