= Sparx Systems =

Australian software company

- Type: Private
- Industry: Software modeling, Software development
- Founded: 1996
- Headquarters: Creswick, Victoria, Australia
- Area served: North America, South America, Europe, Japan, China, India, Southeast Asia, South Africa, Australia
- Key people: Geoffrey Sparks (founder)
- Products: Enterprise Architect; TRAK MDG Technology
- Website: sparxsystems.com

Sparx Systems is an Australian software company founded by Geoffrey Sparks in 1996 in Creswick, Victoria in Australia, known for the development of the Unified Modeling Language tool Enterprise Architect.

Sparx Systems specializes in the development of visual tools for planning, design and development of software intensive systems. This company is known for the development of Enterprise Architect released in 2000, which is nowadays considered one of the more advanced tool sets for UML. In 2006 the company was among the first manufacturers to support the OMG Systems Modeling Language (SysML).

Sparx Systems is a member of the Object Management Group (OMG).
