= UPDM =

Product of Object Management Group

The Unified Profile for DoDAF/MODAF (UPDM) is the product of an Object Management Group (OMG) initiative to develop a modeling standard that supports both the USA Department of Defense Architecture Framework (DoDAF) and the UK Ministry of Defence Architecture Framework (MODAF). The current UPDM - the Unified Profile for DoDAF and MODAF was based on earlier work with the same acronym and a slightly different name - the UML Profile for DoDAF and MODAF.

== History ==
The UPDM initiative began in 2005, when the OMG issued a Request for Proposal. This request was based on the then current versions of DoDAF (1.0) and MODAF (1.1). While the specification submission development was underway, significant changes were made to the DoDAF and MODAF. Therefore, although a UPDM 1.0 beta 1 specification was adopted by the OMG in 2007, and UPDM 1.0 beta 2 was submitted by an OMG Finalization Task Force in 2008, UPDM 1.0 beta 2 has not been endorsed by the US Department of Defense or the UK Ministry of Defence (MOD).

The UPDM 1.0 specification, the result of additional work by many members of the original submission teams, is architecturally aligned with DoDAF 1.5 and MODAF 1.2. This version of the specification has been endorsed by both the US DoD and the UK MOD.

The UPDM 2.0 specification was released in January 2013, and UPDM 2.1 was released in August 2013.

== Motivation for unified profile for DoDAF/MODAF ==
DoDAF v1.5 Volume II includes guidance for representing DoDAF architecture products using UML. MODAF also provides similar guidance, and its meta-model is specified as a UML profile abstract syntax (i.e. extensions of UML 2.1 metaclasses). MODAF differs from DoDAF however, so the MODAF Meta-Model is not suitable for use in DoDAF tools. Differences in vendor implementations have resulted in interoperability issues between tools and additional training requirements for users. Also, the current DoDAF UML implementation guidance is based on a previous version of UML (UML v1.x), and doesn't address the current version (v2.x) or the SysML profile for systems engineering applications.

Modeling tool vendors are challenged to support a variety of DoDAF and MODAF adaptations, that have been created to meet the unique needs of several nationalities. For example, a UML Profile abstract syntax (extending the UML 2.1 meta-model) has been defined for MODAF to support XMI-based file exchange between tools and repositories. But interoperability with DoDAF tools will be difficult because MODAF made significant changes to some DoDAF products and adds two new viewpoints.

In addition to supporting DoDAF and MODAF requirements, UPDM is expected to be able to support other frameworks as well, such as the NATO Architecture Framework NAF which has an identical meta-model to MODAF.

== OMG Adoption Process and DoD/MOD endorsement ==
The OMG Technology Adoption Process includes issuing an RFP, responses to that RFP called submissions, resolution of differences between submissions, acceptance of the final submission, and the chartering of a Finalization Task Force that refines the submission into a specification. Competing proposals were submitted to the OMG to satisfy the UPDM RFP., resulting in a Unified Proposal in March 2007. The Unified Proposal included support for SysML as well as UML.

In 2007, the OMG organized a Finalization Task Force (FTF) to finalize the Unified Proposal (a.k.a. UPDM 1.0 beta 1) so that it could be made into a publicly available specification. The UPDM FTF submitted UPDM 1.0 beta 2 to the OMG in March 2008. The UPDM FTF's March finalization report was not endorsed by DoD and MOD because it was tied to an obsolete version of the DoDAF (DoDAF 1.0) and did not adequately meet DODAF 1.5 or MODAF 1.2 requirements. The OMG Technology Adoption Process specifically prohibits the kind of scope creep that would have resulted in trying to extend the RFP requirements to address the then current versions of the architecture frameworks. Therefore, the FTF report was not accepted by OMG and an alternative path for creating the specification was followed.

The OMG Technology Adaption Process includes an alternative to the RFP-based process called the Request for Comment (RFC). In this process, a completed specification is delivered to the applicable OMG Technology Committee. OMG members are then given time to comment on the specification. Following the comment period, a vote to accept the specification is conducted. If accepted, the delivered specification then enters the same finalization process as an RFP-based submission. Immediately following the rejection of the original UPDM FTF Report, a group identified as the UPDM Group was formed. The result of their efforts was an RFC submission in September 2008 that was accepted by the Domain Technology Committee in December 2008, at which time a new UPDM FTF was chartered.

== Future work ==
DoDAF and MODAF are under configuration control, with new versions being released as the user requirement evolves, and therefore the UPDM will evolve to enable accurate modeling of the changes. One intended improvement is a move to align the meta-models of the two frameworks. As of September 2008, the UPDM Group engaged with the DoD and MOD to participate in the improvement process. The UPDM Group has begun preparation for UPDM 2.0 with a focus on US DoDAF 2.0, Canada DNDAF, and other features.

== Transition to UAF ==
OMG Unified Architecture Framework (UAF) is effectively replacing UPDM.

== See also ==
- Model Driven Engineering (MDE)
