= GeoSciML =

Industry-specific XML-based standard

- Geoscience Markup Language
- Abbreviation: GeoSciML
- Status: Active
- Year started: 1 January 2003
- First published: 1 January 2005
- Organization: Commission for the Management and Application of Geoscience Information (CGI)
- Committee: CGI Interoperability Working Group
- Series: Geoscience Information Standards
- Editors: Marcus Sen, Tim Duffy, et al.
- Authors: Marcus Sen, Tim Duffy, et al.
- Base standards: GML (Geography Markup Language)
- Related standards: OneGeology project, CGI Interoperability Working Group
- Domain: Geoscience, Geology, Data Interoperability
- License: Open (or specify if proprietary)
- Copyright: British Geological Survey

GeoSciML (Geoscience Markup Language) is an application schema based on GML (Geography Markup Language), designed for the interoperable exchange of geological data. It primarily focuses on representing "interpreted geology", which refers to the geological features and processes that are commonly displayed on geological maps.

The schema catalogue includes fundamental geoscience elements such as Mapped Feature, Geologic Unit, Earth Materials, Geologic Structure, and their respective specializations. In addition, it also includes Borehole data and other observational artifacts, which are critical for describing geotechnical and subsurface information.

The GeoSciML project was initiated in 2003, under the auspices of the Commission for the Management and Application of Geoscience Information (CGI) working group on Data Model Collaboration. The project is part of what is known as the CGI Interoperability Working Group, and is intended for publishing data portals, and for interchanging data between organisations that use different database implementations of globally distributed geoscience web services.

Version 3.1 was released in December, 2012. In January, 2013 a Standards Working Group was initiated in the Open Geospatial Consortium to develop a version 4 release as an OGC modular specification. This release will include simple feature 'portrayal' schemes to support interoperable view services.

Documentation, XML schema and other resources are available at the GeoSciML resource repository.

== See also ==
- Systems Geology
- OneGeology
