= NATO Architecture Framework =

Standard for developing and describing enterprise architectures

The aim of the NATO Architecture Framework Version 4 (NAFv4) is to provide a standard for developing and describing enterprise architectures for both military and business use. It provides a standardized way to develop architecture artifacts, by defining the following:

- Introduction – an overview of NAF, what it is and who uses it (Chapter 1)
- Methodology – how to develop architectures and run an architecture project (Chapter 2)
- Viewpoints – conventions for the construction, interpretation and use of architecture views for communicating the enterprise architecture to different stakeholders (Chapter 3)
- Meta-Models – the application of commercial meta-models identified as compliant with NATO policy (Chapter 4)
- Glossary, References and Bibliography (Chapter 5)

The NATO Architecture Framework v4 (NAFv4), issued by the Architecture Capability Team (ACaT) of the NATO Consultation, Command and Control Board (C3B) in January 2018, provides guidance on describing both enterprise architectures and systems architectures.

The objectives of the framework are to:

- Provide a way to organize and present architectures to stakeholders
- Specify the guidance, rules, and product descriptions for developing and presenting architecture information
- Ensure a common approach for understanding, comparing, and integrating architectures,
- Act as a key enabler for acquiring and fielding cost-effective and interoperable capabilities
- Align with architecture references produced by international standard bodies (International Organization for Standardization, Institute of Electrical and Electronics Engineers, The Open Group, Object Management Group etc.)

== Methodology ==
NAFv4 Chapter 2 provides a methodology which includes how to set up an architecting environment, govern, manage, define and evaluate architectures. The methodology has been developed from accepted best practice and standards, detailing the following:

- Terms and concepts for architecture.
- A foundation for architecture activities
- Architecture principles
- Architecture activities at enterprise and project levels
- Architecture repositories and libraries enabling reuse and improved interoperability between communities, and to formalize architecture-based references.

== Architecture Viewpoints (Grid representation) ==
NAFv4 Chapter 3 defines architecture viewpoints which describe the content, concerns addressed, usage and representation.

NAF Architecture Viewpoints serve as the baseline for any NAF-Compliant architecture description effort.

To aid architects, these viewpoints are organized into a logical and consistent manner and presented as a “grid” similar to that used for the Zachman Framework. This ‘grid’ structure, represents the various ‘subjects of concern’ (rows) and ‘aspects of concern’ (columns), as shown below:

The selection of Architecture Viewpoints must be tailored to the stakeholder concerns associated with the architecture task. Suitable Viewpoints need to be identified in the grid, should additional Viewpoints be required they must be defined.

A View is specified by an Architecture Viewpoint, this prescribes the concepts, models, analysis techniques and visualizations that are provided by the View.

An Architecture Viewpoint typically addresses a set of related concerns and is tailored for specific stakeholders. A NAF Architecture Viewpoint provides an example of a corresponding NAF Architecture View but does not have a mechanism to specify architecture view content.

Note: the NAF version 4 (NAFv4) specifies how views of NAF version 3 (NAFv3) can be reused, i.e. each cell of the “grid” refers to the NAFv3 views and the NAFv4 methodology explains how forward and backward compatibility can be ensured.

== Adoption of industry meta-models ==
Chapter 4 of the NATO Architecture Framework identifies the commercial meta-models which can be used to creation viewpoints described in chapter 3:

- The Open Group's ArchiMate, as specified in Version 3.1, and supported by the Archi® free open source tool.
- The Object Management Group's Unified Architecture Framework (UAF) Domain Meta-model (DMM), as specified in Version 1.

== Glossary, references and bibliography ==
Chapter 5 of the NATO Architecture Framework define major definitions and references in line with the major standards and reference documents used in Architecture activities.

=== Web access to download NAFv4 ===
Official site to download the latest version of NAF is available (here) or on the (NATO Portal). An ArchiMate modeling guide for NAF v4, produced by the NATO Digital Policy Committee Architecture Capability Team is available here.

Search for “Architecture Framework” and select the “NATO Architecture Framework, Version 4” entry.
