= PivotPoint Technology Corporation =

PivotPoint Technology Corporation is a software and systems engineering services company headquartered in Fallbrook, California. PivotPoint was founded in 2003 by Cris Kobryn, a noted expert in visual modeling languages and model-driven development technologies. PivotPoint is best known for its model-driven development consulting and training services, the latter which feature UML, SysML, BPMN and DoDAF workshops. PivotPoint is a founding member and a major contributor to the SysML Partners, the group of software tool vendors and industry leaders that convened in 2003 to create a UML dialect for systems engineering called SysML (Systems Modeling Language). In June 2007 the SysML Partners were named a winner in the Modeling category of the SD Times 100, which recognizes the leaders and innovators of the software development industry.
