= Cris Kobryn =

American systems engineer and software engineer

Cris Kobryn (1952) is an American systems engineer and software engineer best known for leading international teams of vendors and users in defining the Unified Modeling Language (UML) v1 and v2 standards for software engineering, as well as the Systems Modeling Language (SysML) v1 standard for systems engineering. He is the Founder and CTO of PivotPoint Technology Corp., a systems and software engineering services company that he founded in 2003.

== Biography ==
Kobryn began his software engineering career in the early 1980s specializing in AI programming languages (Prolog, Lisp, CLOS) and applications (knowledge-based expert systems, natural language processing). He led the applications group at Harlequin Limited in the early 1990s that developed two innovative commercial AI application products: 1) KnowledgeWorks, a Knowledge-Based Expert System (KBES) toolkit built on top of Harlequin's flagship LispWorks product, which supported rule-based or logic programming (including support for Prolog) and a SQL database interface; 2) Watson, a version of KnowledgeWorks customized for police investigative analysis applications, which was eventually acquired by Xanalys Limited.

Kobryn is known as an expert in Model-Based Systems Engineering (MBSE) and Model-Driven Development (MDD) technologies. In 2003 he founded PivotPoint Technology, a systems and software engineering services company that focuses on MBSE and MDD technologies. Prior to founding PivotPoint Kobryn held senior technical positions at Telelogic, EDS, MCI Systemhouse, Inference Corporation, Harlequin, and SAIC. Before Kobryn became a software engineer he served as a commissioned officer in both the U.S. Marine Corps and the U.S. Army, and was infantry, armor, airborne and Special Forces qualified.

Kobryn is a member of the ACM, IEEE, INCOSE and AAAI. He chaired large international teams of vendors and users to specify the Unified Modeling Language (UML) 1.1 and UML 2.0 standards for software engineering, and the Systems Modeling Language (SysML) for systems engineering. In recognition of Kobryn's contributions to the UML, the OMG presented him with its Distinguished Service Award in 2000. In recognition of his contributions to the SysML, the INCOSE presented him with its Outstanding Service Award in 2006. In 2007 Kobryn received the SD Times 100 award for the Modeling category on behalf of the SysML Partners open source project that he chaired.

Kobryn received a BA degree from Colgate University and a BSCS degree from San Diego State University (SDSU). His multi-disciplinary graduate studies at SDSU and UCLA explored the synergies between linguistics, computer science and Artificial Intelligence (AI).

== Publications ==
As an expert in Model-Driven Development and Model-Based Systems Engineering technologies, Kobryn has published a book and many papers and articles on these subjects.

- Gogolla, M and Kobryn, C [Eds.] (2001). UML 2001 - The Unified Modeling Language, 4th International Conference, Toronto, Canada, October 2001 Proceedings, Springer.
- Kobryn, C (1999). "UML 2001", Communications of the ACM, 42(10):29-37.
- Kobryn, C (2000). "Modeling components and frameworks with UML", Communications of the ACM 43 (10), 31-38.
- Kobryn, C (2004). "UML 3.0 and the Future of Modeling", Software and Systems Modeling, 3(1):4–8.
