= Taskon =

Taskon was a Norwegian IT enterprise which developed systems using object-oriented technology. The company also provided advisory and consultancy services, products, and training within the field of object-oriented systems' development. Formed in 1986 by Trygve Reenskaug, Taskon's expertise was in the area of analysis, design, and implementation of component-based systems.

As one of the UML Partners, Taskon helped with the standardization of the Unified Modeling Language (UML).

The company's flagship product was OOram, a software package for the analysis and design of Object-Oriented systems, with support for the role-modeling concept. In addition to providing support for the modeling of complex systems in a highly productive way — encouraging systematic use of object patterns, the product conformed to the UML standard the company helped develop.

== Numerica-Taskon ==
Numerica was another IT company founded in 1986 by four Norwegian Institute of Technology students, including Gunnar Nordseth and Tor Ivar Byrkjeland. The company's expertise included the development of Microsoft Windows software applications, as well as UML modeling. It was one of the few preferred partners of Rational Rose in Norway.

Numerica encountered Taskon during a project for Gjensidige NOR, a Norwegian bank. The companies discovered the complementary nature of their technologies, and shortly afterward, they formed Numerica-Taskon (1999). The following were among the clientele of the new entity:

- ABB Group
- Veritas
- Ericsson
- Gjensidige
- Norges Bank
- Norsk Hydro
- Securitas
- Tandberg Television
- Telenor
- Thomson Financial
- Toyota

In 2000, a Swedish company named OptoSof AB acquired Numerica-Taskon, WinHlp (1993), Mogul Media (1994) and Grape (1997). The result of this merger was Mogul.

== See also ==
- Kantega
