= SysML Partners =

Consortium organized in 2003 to create the System Modeling Language

SysML Partners is a consortium of software tool vendors and industry leaders organized in 2003 to create the Systems Modeling Language (SysML), a dialect of UML customized for systems engineering. The consortium was founded and organized by Cris Kobryn, who previously chaired the UML 1.1 and UML 2.0 specification teams, and Sandy Friedenthal, chair of the OMG Systems Engineering Special Interest Group. The SysML Partners defined SysML as an open source specification, and their specifications include an open source license for distribution and use.

The SysML Partners completed their SysML v. 1.0a specification draft and submitted it to the Object Management Group in November 2005. In recognition of their contributions to modeling, the SysML Partners were named a winner in the "Modeling Category" of the SD Times 100 for 2007.

== See also ==
- Systems Modeling Language
- Unified Modeling Language
- UML Partners
