= P Tech =

P Tech may refer to:

- P.Tech, Professional Technologist, Canadian and Malaysian professional title
- P-TECH, Pathways in Technology Early College High School, New York City public high school
- Ptech, American provider of business process modeling software
