= UML Partners =

UML Partners was a consortium of system integrators and vendors convened in 1996 to specify the Unified Modeling Language (UML). Initially the consortium was led by Grady Booch, Ivar Jacobson, and James Rumbaugh of Rational Software. The UML Partners' UML 1.0 specification draft was proposed to the Object Management Group (OMG) in January 1997. During the same month the UML Partners formed a Semantics Task Force, chaired by Cris Kobryn, to finalize the semantics of the specification and integrate it with other standardization efforts. The result of this work, UML 1.1, was submitted to the OMG in August 1997 and adopted by the OMG in November 1997.

== Member list ==
Members of the consortium include:

- Digital Equipment Corporation
- Hewlett-Packard
- i-Logix
- IBM
- ICON Computing
- IntelliCorp
- MCI Systemhouse
- Microsoft
- ObjecTime
- Oracle Corporation
- Platinum Technology
- Ptech
- Rational Software
- Reich Technologies
- Softeam
- Taskon
- Texas Instruments
- Unisys

== See also ==
- Unified Modeling Language
- object-oriented language
