= Reich Technologies =

Reich Technologies was one of the UML Partners, a consortium that was instrumental to the development of standards for the Unified Modeling Language (UML). The CEO for the company (Georges-Pierre Reich) represented Reich Technologies on the committee, and was involved in the development of the proposal. The proposal was submitted to the Object Management Group (OMG), which approved the proposal, circa late 1997.

== Profile ==
Reich Technologies is an international group of companies, providing a coordinated suite of products and services to support object-oriented (OO) software development in large corporations. With a presence throughout Europe and North America, Reich Technologies occupies leading positions in the world markets for integrated OO CASE tools, fine-grained object repositories and OO team programming environments.

The Intelligent Software Factory (ISF) offers an integrated object-oriented CASE tool suite. It is built on the concept of model-driven development in which the work done at the beginning of a project creates an environment for configuration management and cost containment for software maintenance. ISF has been originally built by Franck Barbier, a French researcher on OO modeling.

The Intelligent Artifact Repository (IAR) provides an enterprise-wide resource for the management and reuse of Information System assets. This concept is so powerful that the development team uses ISF and IAR for production, making ISF the first CASE tool to be self-generated. Recognizing the impact of introducing tools, Reich Technologies offers success oriented services including training, consulting and tool customizations. Corporations combine tools, services and processes with their own organizations to implement a Corporate Software Ecology.

Reich Technologies worked with Alistair Cockburn (special advisor to the Central Bank of Norway) and Ralph Hodgson (founder of TopQuadrant) to flesh out the concept of Use Case and integrate it in the context of Responsibility-Driven Design. Several large companies have built systems upon these constructs since 1992. Structured Use Cases and detailed Responsibility models proved to be a relevant answer to the challenge of gathering and organizing thousands of requirements, defining the scope of the system, and designing an architecture for objects. A methodology with processes and identified deliverables has been created in a joint effort.

As tool builders, Reich Technologies adds the knowledge of implementing lifecycle management for the meta-model objects. Reich Technologies has also extensive experience designing the meta-models that implement in ISF the modeling notations of diverse methodologists.

Reich Technologies sells off-the-shelf and tailored versions of their CASE tools.
