= Systems modeling language =

General-purpose modeling language

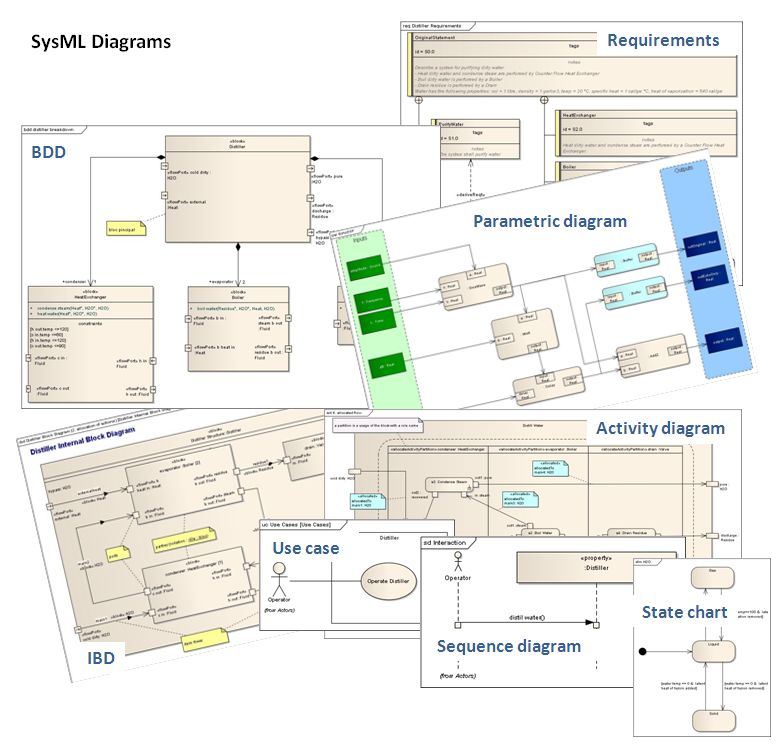
SysML diagrams collage

The systems modeling language (SysML) is a general-purpose modeling language for systems engineering applications. It supports the specification, analysis, design, verification and validation of a broad range of systems and systems-of-systems.

SysML was originally developed by an open source specification project, and includes an open source license for distribution and use. SysML is defined as an extension of a subset of the Unified Modeling Language (UML) using UML's profile mechanism. The language's extensions were designed to support systems engineering activities.

== Contrast with UML ==
SysML offers several systems engineering specific improvements over UML, which has been developed as a software modeling language. These improvements include the following:

- SysML's diagrams express system engineering concepts better due to the removal of UML's software-centric restrictions and adds two new diagram types, requirement and parametric diagrams. The former can be used for requirements engineering; the latter can be used for performance analysis and quantitative analysis. Consequent to these enhancements, SysML is able to model a wide range of systems, which may include hardware, software, information, processes, personnel, and facilities.
- SysML is a comparatively small language that is easier to learn and apply. Since SysML removes many of UML's software-centric constructs, the overall language is smaller both in diagram types and total constructs.
- SysML allocation tables support common kinds of allocations. Whereas UML provides only limited support for tabular notations, SysML furnishes flexible allocation tables that support requirements allocation, functional allocation, and structural allocation. This capability facilitates automated verification and validation (V&V) and gap analysis.
- SysML model management constructs support models, views, and viewpoints. These constructs extend UML's capabilities and are architecturally aligned with IEEE-Std-1471-2000 (IEEE Recommended Practice for Architectural Description of Software Intensive Systems).

SysML reuses seven of UML 2's fourteen "nominative" types of diagrams, and adds two diagrams (requirement and parametric diagrams) for a total of nine diagram types. SysML also supports allocation tables, a tabular format that can be dynamically derived from SysML allocation relationships. A table which compares SysML and UML 2 diagrams is available in the SysML FAQ.

Consider modeling an automotive system: with SysML one can use Requirement diagrams to efficiently capture functional, performance, and interface requirements, whereas with UML one is subject to the limitations of use case diagrams to define high-level functional requirements. Likewise, with SysML one can use Parametric diagrams to precisely define performance and quantitative constraints like maximum acceleration, minimum curb weight, and total air conditioning capacity. UML provides no straightforward mechanism to capture this sort of essential performance and quantitative information.

Concerning the rest of the automotive system, enhanced activity diagrams and state machine diagrams can be used to specify the embedded software control logic and information flows for the on-board automotive computers. Other SysML structural and behavioral diagrams can be used to model factories that build the automobiles, as well as the interfaces between the organizations that work in the factories.

== History ==
The SysML initiative originated in a January 2001 decision by the International Council on Systems Engineering (INCOSE) Model Driven Systems Design workgroup to customize the UML for systems engineering applications. Following this decision, INCOSE and the Object Management Group (OMG), which maintains the UML specification, jointly chartered the OMG Systems Engineering Domain Special Interest Group (SE DSIG) in July 2001. The SE DSIG, with support from INCOSE and the ISO AP 233 workgroup, developed the requirements for the modeling language, which were subsequently issued by the OMG parting in the UML for Systems Engineering Request for Proposal (UML for SE RFP; OMG document ad/03-03-41) in March 2003.

In 2003 David Oliver and Sanford Friedenthal of INCOSE requested that Cris Kobryn, who successfully led the UML 1 and UML 2 language design teams, lead their joint effort to respond to the UML for SE RFP. As Chair of the SysML Partners, Kobryn coined the language name "SysML" (short for "Systems Modeling Language"), designed the original SysML logo, and organized the SysML Language Design team as an open source specification project. Friedenthal served as Deputy Chair, and helped organize the original SysML Partners team.

In January 2005, the SysML Partners published the SysML v0.9 draft specification. Later, in August 2005, Friedenthal and several other original SysML Partners left to establish a competing SysML Submission Team (SST). The SysML Partners released the SysML v1.0 Alpha specification in November 2005.

=== OMG SysML ===
After a series of competing SysML specification proposals, a SysML Merge Team was proposed to the OMG in April 2006. This proposal was voted upon and adopted by the OMG in July 2006 as OMG SysML, to differentiate it from the original open source specification from which it was derived. Because OMG SysML is derived from open source SysML, it also includes an open source license for distribution and use.

The OMG SysML v. 1.0 specification was issued by the OMG as an Available Specification in September 2007. The current version of OMG SysML is v1.6, which was issued by the OMG in December 2019. In addition, SysML was published by the International Organization for Standardization (ISO) in 2017 as a full International Standard (IS), ISO/IEC 19514:2017 (Information technology — Object management group systems modeling language).

The OMG issued a Request for Proposals (RFP) for SysML version 2 on December 8, 2017, following its open standardization process. A second RFP for a SysML v2.0 Application Programming Interface (API) and Services RFP was issued in June 2018. The OMG approved final adoption of SysML v2.0 (SysML v2) in July 2025, with the specification published in September 2025. SysML v2 supports both textual and graphic notation, enabling more automated model manipulation, consistent semantics, and reduced ambiguity for Model-Based Systems Engineering (MBSE) applications. Although SysML v2 offers significant improvements in semantic rigor and interoperability vis-à-vis SysML v1, its lack of backward compatibility and tooling immaturity present substantial challenges for large-scale mission-critical MBSE projects.

== Diagrams ==
SysML includes 9 types of diagram, some of which are taken from UML.

- Activity diagram
- Block definition diagram
- Internal block diagram
- Package diagram
- Parametric diagram
- Requirement diagram
- Sequence diagram
- State machine diagram
- Use case diagram

== Tools ==
There are several modeling tool vendors offering SysML support. Lists of tool vendors who support SysML or OMG SysML can be found on the SysML Forum or OMG SysML websites, respectively.

=== Model exchange ===
As an OMG UML 2.0 profile, SysML models are designed to be exchanged using the XML Metadata Interchange (XMI) standard. In addition, architectural alignment work is underway to support the ISO 10303 (also known as STEP, the Standard for the Exchange of Product model data) AP-233 standard for exchanging and sharing information between systems engineering software applications and tools.

== See also ==
- SoaML
- Energy systems language
- Object process methodology
- Universal Systems Language
- List of SysML tools
