= Kantega =

Norwegian software corporation

Kantega AS
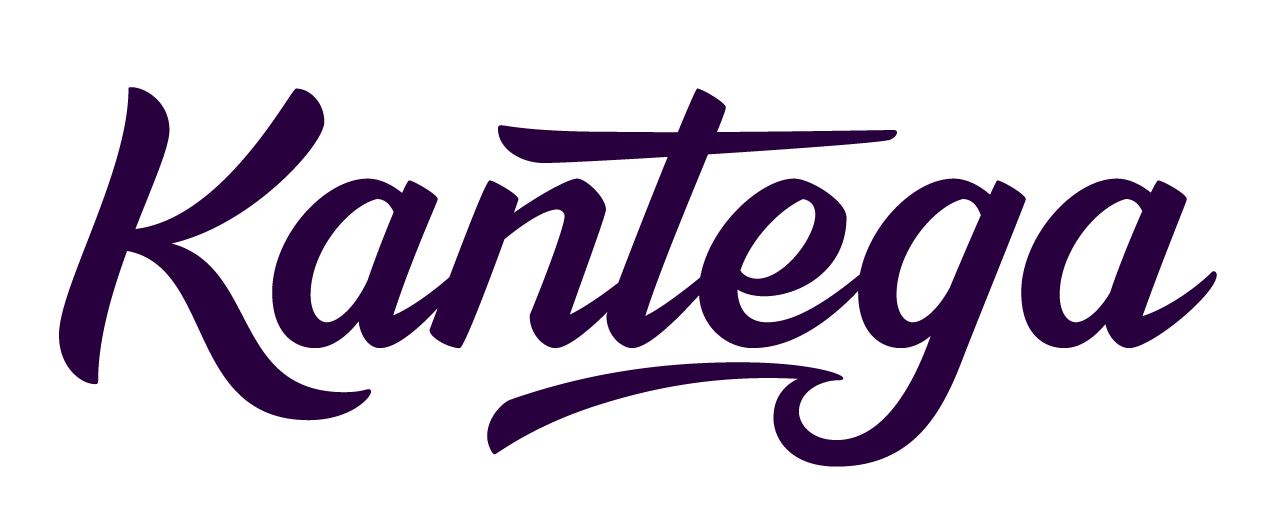
- Type: Private company
- Industry: Information technology
- Founded: 2003
- Headquarters: Oslo, Norway
- Area served: Scandinavia
- Key people: Marit Collin, CEO and founder, Jon Øyvind Eriksen, Chair of the board and founder
- Services: IT consulting, technology, design and UX
- Revenue: ▲NOK 245 million (2020)
- Number of employees: ~180 (2021)
- Website: www.kantega.no

Kantega is a Norwegian software corporation founded in 2003 with headquarters in Oslo. Kantega primarily develops bespoke software based on Java and lightweight application frameworks. It also has offices in Trondheim and Bergen.

Kantega is a sponsor member of Liberty Alliance and WS-I.

== History ==
Kantega was founded as an employee-owned company in 2003. However, the company can trace it roots back to Taskon, a Norwegian IT company founded in 1986. This company developed its own object orientation methodology (OORam) and OO design tools, which had some international success. Taskon contributed its object-oriented methodology to the Object Management Group during the standardization process of UML, as part of a joint standards proposal with IBM and Ptech.

Taskon merged with Numerica in 1998, and with Internet Aksess in 1999, which had launched the world's first public mobile web bank on September 24, 1999, using the emerging WAP standard. In December 1999, the company was bought by the Nordic Internet Consultancy Mogul Group (publ.)

In 2002, the company became the first Norwegian member of WS-I. The early focus on web services technology and standards laid the foundation for a strong position in the emerging market for solutions based on service-oriented architecture.

In 2003, the Swedish IT group Adera (publ.) launched a public tender for the Mogul group. During the tender period the Norwegian part of the group was bought out by the employees. For a short period the restructured Norwegian company used the former name Taskon, before it changed its name to Kantega.

In 2005, Kantega created the secure web services architectures for the Norwegian government's citizen portal MyPage, which offers a unified view to personal data stored in public registers and the opportunity to submit online applications and notifications. This technology was later used as basis for a service-oriented architecture for the pension fund industry, which in 2007 hired Kantega to build Norsk Pensjon, a common internet portal for all major pension funds in Norway, providing all citizens with a unified view of their personal pension holdings across all asset managers.

In 2005, Kantega became the first Norwegian member of Liberty Alliance, signalling an increased focus on internet identity solutions. One year later Kantega created the subsidiary Kantega Secure Identity, which offered the first online identity provider service covering the Nordic countries. In 2007, the subsidiary had received a large market share in the emerging Scandinavian online identity provider market, and was spun off as an independent company under the name Signicat. The successful spin-off attracted 10 million NOK in venture funding in 2008. In 2019, Signicat was sold to Nordic Capital.

In 2018, Kantega created the spin-off company, Kantega SSO. KSSO specialize in Single sign-on (SSO) add-ons for Atlassian Confluence, Jira, Bitbucket, Fisheye/Crucible and Bamboo.

== Technology ==
Kantega's secure software platform is based on open source Java and web services technology. Kantega uses a variety of security technologies and service oriented architecture standards in order to secure data and information exchange, such as PKI, WS-Security and SAML (federated identity).

== Recognition ==
The global newspaper Financial Times named Kantega on its 2007 and 2008, lists of the 100 Best Workplaces in Europe. In 2008, the employee-owned company was also recognized as the most family-friendly workplace in Norway.
