= Trygve Reenskaug =

Norwegian computer scientist (1930–2024)

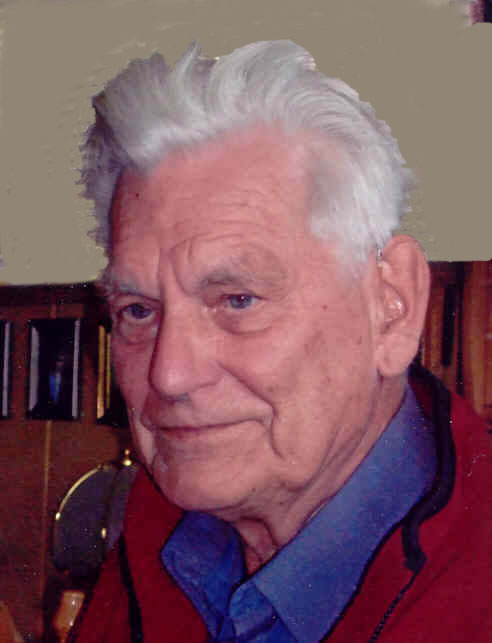
- Reenskaug in 2010
- Born: Trygve Mikkjel Heyerdahl Reenskaug; 21 June 1930
- Died: 14 June 2024 (aged 93)
- Known for: Model–view–controller, object-oriented role analysis and modeling, personal programming
- Scientific career
- Fields: Computer science
- Workplaces: Sentralinstitutt for industriell forskning, Xerox PARC, Taskon University of Oslo
- Website: folk.universitetetioslo.no/trygver

Trygve Mikkjel Heyerdahl Reenskaug (21 June 1930 – 14 June 2024) was a Norwegian computer scientist and professor emeritus of the University of Oslo. He formulated the model–view–controller (MVC) pattern for graphical user interface (GUI) software design in 1979 while visiting the Xerox Palo Alto Research Center (PARC). His first major software project, "Autokon," produced a successful computer-aided design – computer-aided manufacturing (CAD/CAM) program which was first used in 1963, and continued in use by shipyards worldwide for more than 30 years.

Reenskaug described his early Smalltalk and object-oriented programming conceptual efforts as follows:

MVC was conceived as a general solution to the problem of users controlling a large and complex data set. The hardest part was to hit upon good names for the different architectural components. Model-View-Editor was the first set. After long discussions, particularly with Adele Goldberg, we ended with the terms Model-View-Controller.

Reenskaug was extensively involved in research into object-oriented methods and developed the Object Oriented Role Analysis and Modeling (OOram) and the OOram tool in 1983. He founded the information technology company Taskon in 1986, which developed tools based on OOram. The OOram ideas matured and evolved substantially into the BabyUML project, which culminated in creating the data, context and interaction (DCI) paradigm.

Reenskaug wrote the book Working With Objects: The OOram Software Engineering Method with co-authors Per Wold and Odd Arild Lehne. Later he wrote a virtual machine for Unified Modeling Language (UML). As of 2005, he was professor emeritus of informatics at the University of Oslo.

Reenskaug died on 14 June 2024, at the age of 93.
