= Requirement diagram =

A requirement diagram is a diagram specially used in SysML in which requirements and the relations between them and their relationship to other model elements are shown as discussed in the following paragraphs.

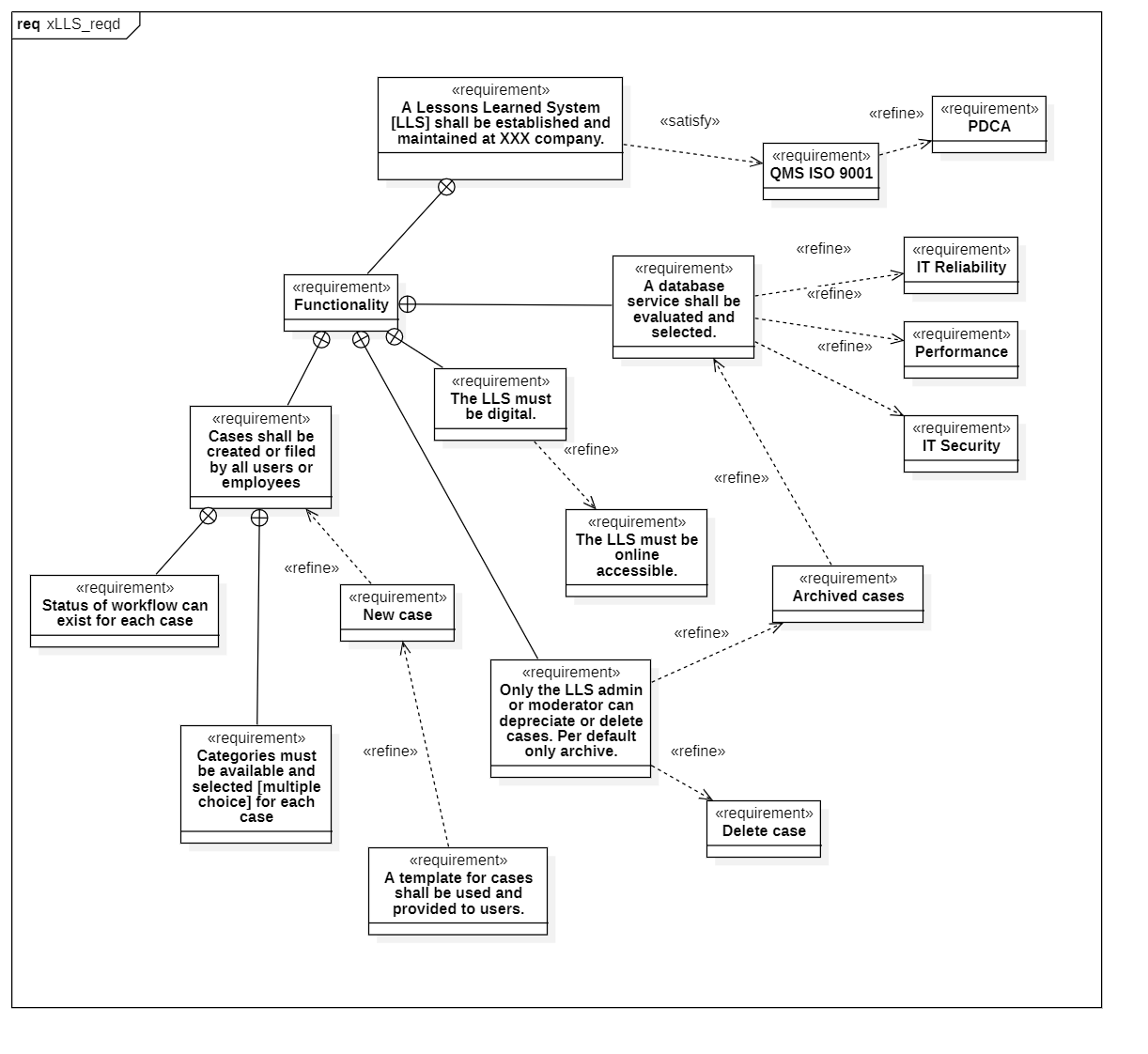
Demonstration of requirements diagram for a basic lessons learned system.

== Derive requirement relationship ==
If a requirement is derived from another requirement, their relation is named "derive requirement relationship".

== Namespace containment ==
If a requirement is contained in another requirement, their relation is named "namespace containment".

== Satisfy relationship ==
If a requirement is satisfied by a design element, their relation is named "satisfy relationship".

== Copy relationship ==
If a requirement is a copy of another requirement, their relation is named "copy relationship".

== Verify relationship ==
If there exists a relation between a requirement and a test case verifying this requirement, their relation is named "verify relationship".

== Test case ==
A test case is defined by a flow checking whether the system under consideration satisfies a requirement.

== Refine relationship ==
If a requirement is refined by other requirements / model elements, the relation is named "refine relationship".

== Trace relationship ==
If there exists a relation between a requirement and an arbitrary model element traced by this requirement, their relation is named "trace relationship".
