= Model-based systems engineering =

Systems engineering methodology

Model-based systems engineering (MBSE) represents a paradigm shift in systems engineering, replacing traditional document-centric approaches with a methodology that uses structured domain models as the primary means of information exchange and system representation throughout the engineering lifecycle.

Unlike document-based approaches where system specifications are scattered across numerous text documents, spreadsheets, and diagrams that can become inconsistent over time, MBSE centralizes information in interconnected models that automatically maintain relationships between system elements. These models serve as the authoritative source of truth for system design, enabling automated verification of requirements, real-time impact analysis of proposed changes, and generation of consistent documentation from a single source. This approach significantly reduces errors from manual synchronization, improves traceability between requirements and implementation, and facilitates earlier detection of design flaws through simulation and analysis.

The MBSE approach has been widely adopted across industries dealing with complex systems development, including aerospace, defense, rail, automotive, and manufacturing. By enabling consistent system representation across disciplines and development phases, MBSE helps organizations manage complexity, reduce development risks, improve quality, and enhance collaboration among multidisciplinary teams.

The International Council on Systems Engineering (INCOSE) defines MBSE as the formalized application of modeling to support system requirements, design, analysis, verification and validation activities beginning in the conceptual design phase and continuing throughout development and later life cycle phases.

== History ==
The first known prominent public usage of the term "Model-Based Systems Engineering" is a book by A. Wayne Wymore with the same name. The MBSE term was also commonly used among the SysML Partners consortium during the formative years of their Systems Modeling Language (SysML) open source specification project during 2003-2005, so they could distinguish SysML from its parent language UML v2, where the latter was software-centric and associated with the term Model-Driven Development (MDD). The standardization of SysML in 2006 resulted in widespread modeling tool support for it and associated MBSE processes that emphasized SysML as their lingua franca.

In September 2007, the MBSE approach was further generalized and popularized when INCOSE introduced its "MBSE 2020 Vision", which was not restricted to SysML, and supported other competitive modeling language standards, such as AP233, HLA, and Modelica. According to the MBSE 2020 Vision: "MBSE is expected to replace the document-centric approach that has been practiced by systems engineers in the past and to influence the future practice of systems engineering by being fully integrated into the definition of systems engineering processes."

As of 2014, the scope of MBSE started to cover more Modeling and Simulation topics, in an attempt to bridge the gap between system model specifications and related system software simulations. As a consequence, the term "modeling and simulation-based systems engineering" has also been increasingly associated along with MBSE.

According to the INCOSE SEBoK (Systems Engineering Book of Knowledge) MBSE may be considered a "subset of digital engineering". INCOSE hosts an annual meeting on MBSE, as well as MBSE working groups.

== See also ==
- AUTOSAR (AUTomotive Open System ARchitecture)
- Engineering Information Management (EIM)
- Hardware-in-the-loop simulation
- List of requirements engineering tools
- List of SysML tools
- Model-based design (MBD)
- Model-driven development (MDD)
- Object Management Group
- OPM - Object Process Methodology (ISO/PAS 19450:2015)
- Systems engineering (SE)
- SysML - Systems Modeling Language
- UML - Unified Modeling Language
