= Dov Dori =

Israeli-American computer scientist (born 1953)

- דב דורי
- Born: September 2, 1953 (age 72); Haifa, Israel
- Education: Technion – Israel Institute of Technology (BS) Tel Aviv University (MS) Weizmann Institute of Science (PhD)
- Known for: Development of Object Process Methodology (OPM)
- Awards: Technion Klein Research Award, Hershel Rich Innovation Award, IEEE Fellow, IAPR Fellow, AAIA Fellow, ACM Senior Member, INCOSE Pioneer Award
- Scientific career
- Fields: Computer science, Information systems engineering
- Workplaces: Technion – Israel Institute of Technology, Massachusetts Institute of Technology
- Doctoral advisor: Amir Pnueli, Shimon Ullman

Dov Dori (Hebrew: דב דורי; born 2 September 1953) is an Israeli-American computer scientist, and Professor of Information Systems Engineering at Technion – Israel Institute of Technology, known for the development of Object Process Methodology (OPM). The ideas underlying OPM were published for the first time in 1995.

== Biography ==
Born in Haifa, Israel, Dori received his BS in Industrial Engineering and Management in 1975 at the Technion – Israel Institute of Technology. In 1981 he received his MS at the Tel Aviv University, Leon Recanati Graduate School of Business Administration, and in 1988 his PhD in Operations Research from the Weizmann Institute of Science under supervision of Amir Pnueli and Shimon Ullman.

Dori started his academic career in the United States as assistant professor in Computer Science at the University of Kansas in 1987. At the Technion, Israel Institute of Technology in the Faculty of Industrial Engineering and Management he was appointed Senior Lecturer in 1991, Associate Professor in 1999, and Professor in 2008. Since 2010 At the Technion he also heads the Enterprise Systems Modeling Laboratory. Between 2000 and 2020 he was intermittently Visiting Associate Professor and later Visiting Professor and Scholar at Sloan Business School and the School of Engineering of the Massachusetts Institute of Technology.

Dori is known for the development of Object Process Methodology, for which he received the Technion Klein Research Award and the Hershel Rich Innovation Award. He is IEEE Fellow since 2017 "For contributions to model-based systems engineering and document analysis recognition" and IEEE Life Fellow since 2021. He is Fellow of the International Association for Pattern Recognition (IAPR) since 2000, Fellow of the Asia-Pacific Artificial Intelligence Association (AAIA) since 2021, and ACM Senior Member since 2006. In 2023 he received the INCOSE Pioneer Award "For his seminal work as a researcher and educator, and most successfully transitioning research to practice." He has published in the fields of conceptual modeling of complex systems, systems architecture and design, and systems biology.

== Selected publications ==
1980s

- Pliskin, Joseph; Dori, Dov (1982). "Ranking Alternative Warehouse Area Assignments: a Multiattribute Approach". IIE Transactions. 14: 19–26. doi:10.1080/05695558208974578.
- Dori, Dov; Ben-Bassat, Moshe (1983). "Circumscribing a Convex Polygon by a Polygon of Fewer Sides with Minimal Area Addition". Computer Vision, Graphics, and Image Processing. 24 (2): 131–159. doi:10.1016/0734-189x(83)90040-3.

1990s

- Dori, D. (1995). "Object-Process Analysis: Maintaining the Balance between System Structure and Behavior". Journal of Logic and Computation. 5 (2): 227–249. doi:10.1093/logcom/5.2.227.
- Dori, Dov; Bruckstein, Alfred (1995). Shape, Structure and Pattern Recognition. Singapore: World Scientific Co. ISBN 981-02-2239-4.
- Amin, Adnan; Dori, Dov; Pudil, Pavel; Freeman, Herbert. Advances in Pattern Recognition, Joint IAPR International Workshops, SSPR'98 and SPR'98. Sydney, Australia.

2000s

- Dori, Dov; Liu, Wenyin (2001). Algorithms for 2D Engineering Drawings Recognition - Implementation and Evaluation.
- Dori, D. (2002). Object-Process Methodology – A Holistic Systems Paradigm. New York: Springer Verlag.
- Dori, Dov (2002). Object-Process Methodology – A Holistic Systems Paradigm. Berlin, Heidelberg, New York: Springer Verlag. ISBN 3-540-65471-2.
- Soffer, P.; Golany, B.; Dori, D. (2003). "ERP modeling: a comprehensive approach" (PDF). Information Systems. 28 (6): 673–690. doi:10.1016/s0306-4379(02)00078-9.
- Reinhartz-Berger, I.; Dori, D. (2004). "Object-Process Methodology (OPM) vs. UML: A Code Generation Perspective" (PDF). Proceedings of the CAiSE'04 Workshops. Vol. 1. pp. 275–286.
- Niemann, Jorg; Tichkiewitch, Serge; Westkamper, Engelbert (2008). Design of Sustainable Product Life Cycles. Springer.
- Dori, Dov; Reich, Yoram (2009). Proceedings of the International Conference on Model-Based Systems Engineering (MBSE'09). Haifa and Herzeliya, Israel.

2010s

- Dori, Dov; Mordecai, Yaniv (2013). "Model-Based Risk-Oriented Robust Systems Design with Object-Process Methodology". International Journal of Strategic Engineering Asset Management: 331–354.
- Sharon, Amira; Dori, Dov (2014). "A Project-Product Model-Based Approach to Planning Work Breakdown Structures of Complex System Projects". IEEE Systems Journal. 9 (2): 366–376. Bibcode:2015ISysJ...9..366S. doi:10.1109/JSYST.2013.2297491. S2CID 14582977.
- Wachs, Juan; Frenkel, Boaz; Dori, Dov (2014). "Operation Room Tool Handling and Miscommunication Scenarios: An Object-Process Methodology Conceptual Model". Artificial Intelligence in Medicine. 62 (3): 153–163. doi:10.1016/j.artmed.2014.10.006. PMID 25466935.
- Somekh, Judith; Haimovich, Gal; Guterman, Adi; Dori, Dov; Choder, Mordechai (2014). "Conceptual Modeling of mRNA Decay Provokes New Hypotheses". PLOS ONE. 9 (9) e107085. Bibcode:2014PLoSO...9j7085S. doi:10.1371/journal.pone.0107085. PMC 4177816. PMID 25255440.
- Wengrowicz, Niva; Dori, Yehudit Judy; Dori, Dov (2014). "Transactional Distance in an Undergraduate Project-based Systems Modeling Course". Knowledge-Based Systems. 71: 41–51. doi:10.1016/j.knosys.2014.05.022.
- Sharon, Amira; de Weck, Olivier; Dori, Dov (2014). "Teaching and Assessing Project-Product Lifecycle Management and Gantt Chart Models to Systems Engineers: A Comparative Study".
- Dori, Dov; Renick, Aharon; Wengrowicz, Niva (2015). "When Quantitative Meets Qualitative: Enhancing OPM Conceptual Systems Modeling with MATLAB Computational Capabilities". Research in Engineering Design.
- Bolshchikov, Sergey; Somekh, Judith; Mazor, Shay; Niva, Wengrowicz; Choder, Mordechai; Dori, Dov (2015). "Cognition-Based Visualization of Conceptual Models: The Vivid OPM Scene Player". Systems Engineering. doi:10.1002/sys.21321. S2CID 1344692.
- Blekhman, Alex; Wachs, Juan P.; Dori, Dov (2015). "Model-Based System Specification with Tesperanto: Readable Text from Formal Graphics". IEEE Transactions on Systems, Man, and Cybernetics: Systems. 45 (11): 1448–1458. Bibcode:2015ITSMC..45.1448B. doi:10.1109/TSMC.2015.2406753. S2CID 6631880.
- Dori, Dov; Thipphayathetthana, Somwang (2015). "Model-Based Guidelines for User-Centric Satellite Control Software Development". International Journal of Satellite Communications and Networking. 34 (2): 295–319. doi:10.1002/sat.1123. hdl:1721.1/105320. S2CID 41268902.
- Dori, Dov (2016). Model-Based Systems Engineering with OPM and SysML. New York: Springer.
