= ObjecTime =

Software company in Canada

ObjecTime Limited
- Industry: software
- Founded: 1992
- Headquarters: Kanata, Ontario
- Products: Real-Time Object-Oriented Modelling

ObjecTime Limited of Kanata, Ontario was a software company with the known software product ObjecTime Developer.

== Founding of ObjecTime and early years ==
ObjectTime was founded in 1992 by former employees of Bell-Northern Research who worked on the Telos project. The company developed the product of the same name.

In 1994, the ObjecTime language was renamed to "ROOM" (Real-Time Object-Oriented Modelling) and the Real-Time Object-Oriented Modeling (ROOM) book was published.

In 1998, a UML version of the ROOM language, created as the "UML-RT" profile, was made available.

== Acquisition of ObjecTime ==
Rational Software (developer of the product known as Rational Rose), had been collaborating with ObjecTime Limited since 1997. At the beginning of the year 2000, Rational Software acquired ObjecTime Limited. Their respective products — Rational Rose and ObjecTime Developer — were then merged into a product that was rechristened Rational Rose RealTime.

In 2002, Rational Software was acquired by IBM, which elected to adopt the products.

== Resources ==
As of 2006, IBM continues to make legacy documentation available on the following products:

- ObjecTime — legacy documentation
- Rational Rose — current and legacy documentation
- Rational Rose RealTime — current and legacy documentation
