= MCI Systemhouse =

American information technology company

MCI Systemhouse, Inc.
- Type: Private
- Predecessor: SHL Systemhouse
- Founded: 1974
- Defunct: 1999
- Fate: Acquired and merged into Electronic Data Systems in 1999.
- Headquarters: Ottawa, Canada
- Area served: Global

MCI Systemhouse, Inc., was an American information technology company that specialized in data centers for large corporations. It was a subsidiary of the Washington, DC–based MCI Communications Corporation, the result of a 1995 $1 billion acquisition of Canadian company SHL Systemhouse and its subsequent integration with MCI's technical services branch. The new company was formed to provide systems integration and outsourcing services. SHL Systemhouse based in Ottawa, Ontario, had revenue of $1.2 billion Canadian dollars in 1994, or about $883 million at then current exchange rates.

On February 11, 1999, MCI Systemhouse was acquired by EDS of Plano, Texas, for $1.65 billion. EDS was able to recoup almost 25% of the purchase price by selling SHL Systemhouse's stake in Commerce One for $400 million in January, 2000. Prior to the acquisition, MCI Systemhouse was one of several entities that formed UML Partners, a group devoted to the development of the Unified Modeling Language (UML).

Customers of MCI Systemhouse have included Vons, CSAA, Ultramar, Canada Post Corporation, and United States Postal Service.
