= Internal block diagram =

Graphical representation of internal (whitebox) structure

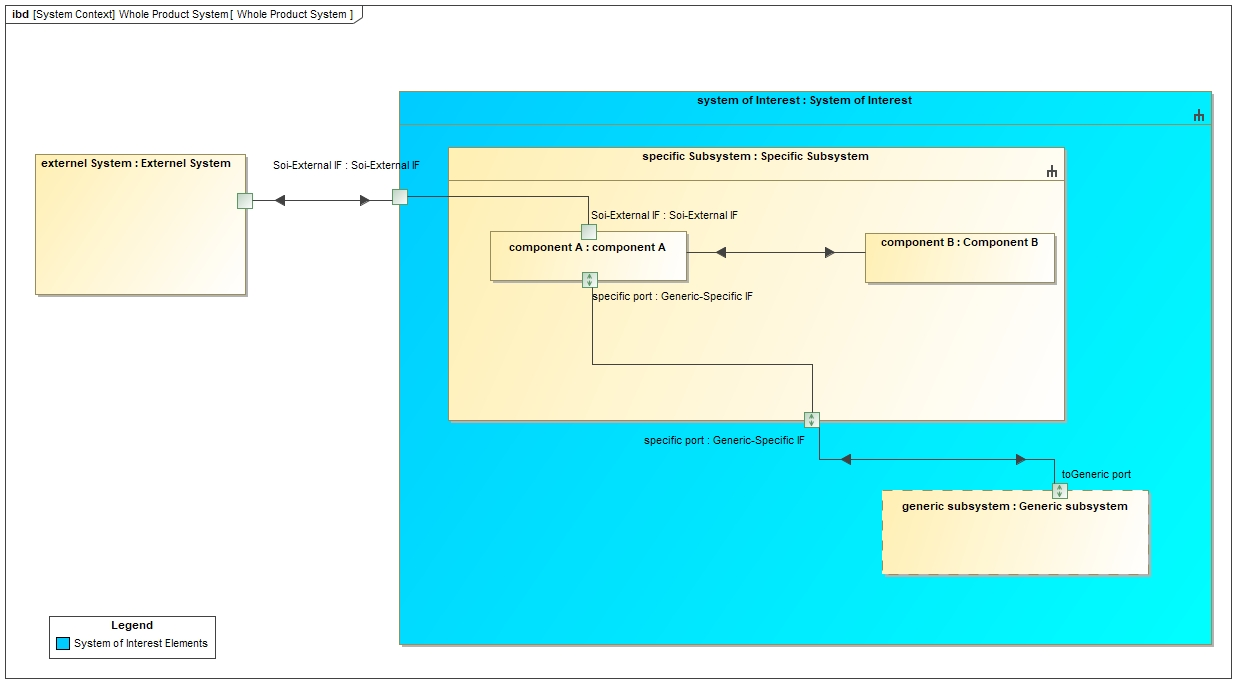
Example IBD showing internal structure of a subsystem and the ports to other subsystems and external systems.

Internal Block Diagrams (IBD) are a static representation of the internal structure of blocks. Where the BDDs represent a black box view of the system, the IBDs represent a white box view. It details how the parts of a block are interconnected through ports and connectors, providing a clear visualization of the system's internal composition and interactions.

== Elements ==
=== Parts ===
The IBD represents the internal structure of a block, and the internal components of the block are represented by parts. These parts may have a multiplicity defined, indicating the number of instances of the component that may exist in the block.

=== Reference Properties ===
An IBD may contain external elements that the block does not own. These are represented by rectangles with dashed borders.

=== Ports ===
Ports specify interaction points between parts. In an IBD, they are represented by small squares on the edges of a part. There are two types of ports:

- Standard ports define provided and required interfaces.
- Flow ports specify the flow of objects between parts.

=== Connectors ===
Connectors are lines that connect ports and represent communication paths between the parts. Information, energy, and materials flow over these connectors.
