= Ptech =

Defunct American company

Ptech Inc.
- Type: Private
- Industry: Software
- Founded: 1994; 32 years ago
- Defunct: 2003; 23 years ago
- Fate: Restructured and renamed to GoAgile
- Key people: Yasin al-Qadi, investor

Ptech Inc. was a Quincy, Massachusetts-based provider of business process modeling software that was renamed to GoAgile in late 2003 as a consequence to the media frenzy following the consented search on December 5, 2002 by federal authorities under the auspices of Operation Green Quest. The search was related to the relationship of the company to businessman Yassin Kadi, a multi-millionaire from Jeddah who trained as an architect in Chicago.

== Business domain ==
Describing itself as a "provider of enterprise architecture, business modeling, analysis and integration software solutions," the privately held corporation was founded in 1994, and known for its technology, which was based on a unique implementation of neural net and semantic technologies. Ptech was recognized as one New England Technology's "Fast 50" by Deloitte Touche Tohmatsu in 2001.

The CEO of Ptech, Oussama Ziade, appeared on different television shows in the USA and has been featured on the cover of several magazines. The company was once part of UML Partners, the consortium that was convened to develop standards for UML, the Unified Modeling Language.

== Federal investigation ==
Ptech was thrust into the national spotlight following a consented search by U.S. law enforcement officials at Ptech’s headquarters on December 5, 2002, in connection with Operation Green Quest. The consented search was misrepresented by national news media as a raid. This unfavorable national publicity resulted in the eventual closing of the company in late 2003. Former Ptech employees described Ptech as a company which encouraged diversity in the workplace that respected their cultures and traditions; they attributed the media frenzy that engulfed Ptech to the politically charged atmosphere generated by the 9/11 terrorist attack.

The Ptech investigation followed sanctions placed on Yassin Kadi, a former Ptech investor, after he was placed on a list of alleged terrorists. On October 12, 2001, the U.S. Department of Treasury's Office of Foreign Assets Control (OFAC) ordered the assets of Yassin Kadi in the United States to be frozen and Federal law prohibited financial transactions involving his property. The European Union also applied sanctions to Qadi.

Qadi's listing as a terrorist was later overturned by several European courts, and his name was removed from blacklists by Switzerland (2007), the European Union (2008 and 2010), and the United Kingdom (2008 and 2010).

On 13 September 2010, Yassin Kadi "succeeded in having dismissed in their entirety the civil claims brought against him in the United States on behalf of the families of the 9/11 victims." On 5 October 2012, the UN Security Council committee monitoring sanctions against al-Qaeda granted Qadi's petition to be removed from its blacklist. On 26 November 2014, the United States Department of the Treasury removed Qadi's name from its Specially Designated Nationals list.

== Notable clientele ==
Ptech had a security clearance to work on sensitive military projects dating to 1997. The company's roster of clients included several governmental agencies, including the United States Armed Forces, NATO, Congress, the Department of Energy, the Department of Justice, the Federal Bureau of Investigation, U.S. Customs and Border Protection, Federal Aviation Administration, Internal Revenue Service, United States Secret Service, and the White House.

== Notable personnel ==
- Yaqub Mirza, angel investor, board member.
