= Object Process Methodology =

Modelling language and methodology for capturing knowledge and designing systems

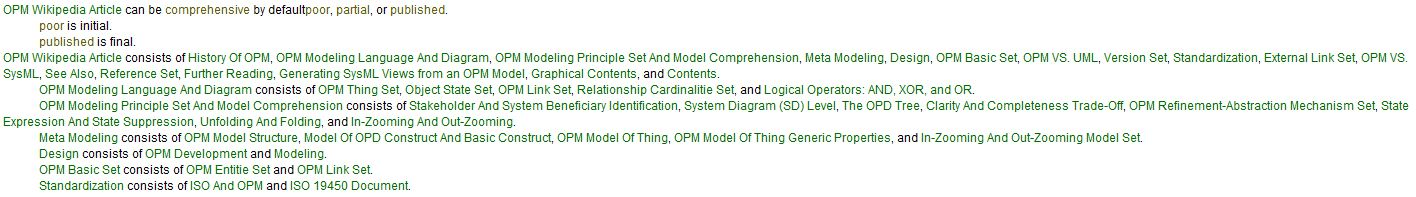
Graphical contents OPL: an example of the OPM language

Object process methodology (OPM) is a conceptual modeling language and methodology for capturing knowledge and designing systems, specified as ISO/PAS 19450. Based on a minimal universal ontology of stateful objects and processes that transform them, OPM can be used to formally specify the function, structure, and behavior of artificial and natural systems in a large variety of domains.

OPM was conceived and developed by Dov Dori. The ideas underlying OPM were published for the first time in 1995. Since then, OPM has evolved and developed.

In 2002, the first book on OPM was published, and on December 15, 2015, after six years of work by ISO TC184/SC5, ISO adopted OPM as ISO/PAS 19450. A second book on OPM was published in 2016.

Since 2019, OPM has become a foundation for a Professional Certificate program in Model-Based Systems Engineering - MBSE at EdX. Lectures are available as web videos on Youtube.

== Overview ==
Object process methodology (OPM) is a conceptual modeling language and methodology for capturing knowledge and designing systems. Based on a minimal universal ontology of stateful objects and processes that transform them, OPM can be used to formally specify the function, structure, and behavior of artificial and natural systems in a large variety of domains. Catering to human cognitive abilities, an OPM model represents the system under design or study bimodally in both graphics and text for improved representation, understanding, communication, and learning.

In OPM, an object is anything that does or does not exist. Objects are stateful—they may have states, such that at each point in time, the object is at one of its states or in transition between states. A process is a thing that transforms an object by creating or consuming it, or by changing its state.

OPM is bimodal; it is expressed both visually/graphically in object-process diagrams (OPD) and verbally/textually in Object-Process Language (OPL), a set of automatically generated sentences in a subset of English. A patented software package called OPCAT, for generating OPD and OPL, is freely available.

== History ==
The shift to the object-oriented (OO) paradigm for computer programming languages, which occurred in the 1980s and 1990s, was followed by the idea that programming should be preceded by object-oriented analysis and design of the programs, and, more generally, the systems those programs represent and serve. Thus, in the early 1990s, over 30 object-oriented analysis and design methods and notations flourished, leading to what was known as the "methods war".

— Dov Dori, "Preface", Model-Based Systems Engineering with OPM and SysML (2017)

Around that time, in 1991, Dov Dori, who then joined Technion – Israel Institute of Technology as faculty said in his 2016 book Model-Based Systems Engineering with OPM and SysML that he:

realized that just as the procedural approach to software was inadequate, so was the “pure” OO approach, which puts objects as the sole “first class” citizens, with “methods” (or “services”) being their second-class subordinate procedures.

— Dov Dori, "Preface", Model-Based Systems Engineering with OPM and SysML (2017)

Dori published the first paper on OPM in 1995.

In 1997, Unified Modeling Language (UML), by the Object Management Group (OMG), became the de facto standard for software design. UML 1.1 was submitted to the OMG in August 1997 and adopted by the OMG in November 1997.

The first book on OPM, Object-Process Methodology: a Holistic Systems Paradigm, was published in 2002, and OPM has since been applied in many domains.

In August 2014, the ISO adopted OPM as ISO/PAS 19450.

A second book on OPM, which also covers SysML, was published in 2016.

== Design ==
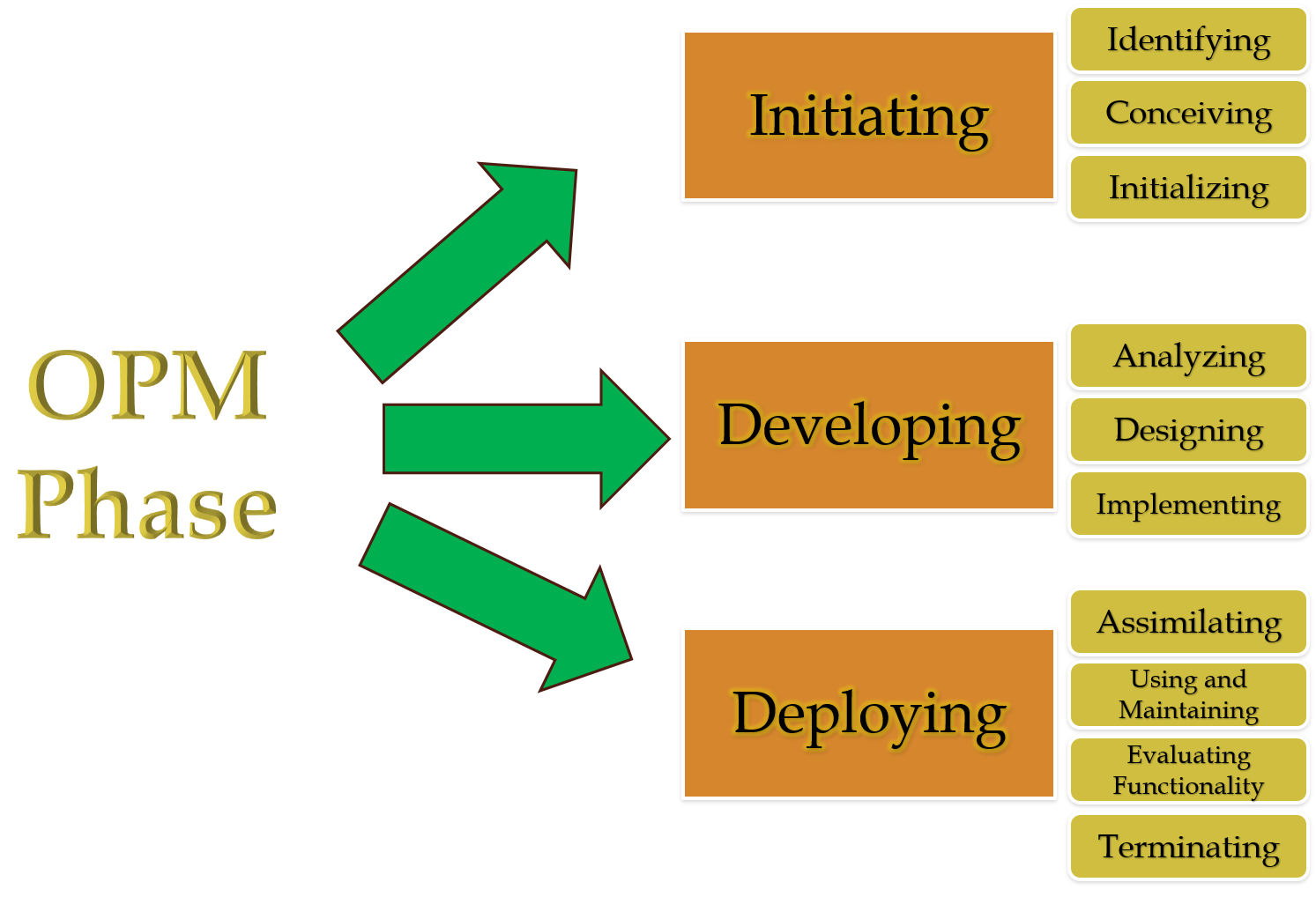
OPM methodology phases

Object-Process Methodology (OPM) is a systems modeling paradigm that integrates two aspects inherent in any system: its structure and its behavior. Structure is represented via objects and structural relations among them, such as aggregation-participation (whole-part relation) and generalization-specialization ("is-a" relation). Behavior is represented by processes and how they transform objects: How they create or consume objects, or how they change the states of an object.

OPM offers a way to model systems of almost any domain, be it artificial or natural.

=== Modeling ===
OPM consists of object process diagramׂs (OPD) and a corresponding set of sentences in a subset of English, called Object Process Language (OPL). OPL is generated automatically by OPCAT, a software tool that supports modeling in OPM.

Object process diagram (OPD)

OPD is the one and only kind of diagram of OPM. This uniqueness of diagram kind is a major contributor to OPM's simplicity, and it is in sharp contrast to UML, which has 14 kinds of diagrams, and to SysML, which has nine such kinds. An OPD graphically describes objects, processes and links among them. Links can be structural and procedural. Structural links connect objects to objects or processes to processes, expressing the static system aspect—how the system is structured. Procedural links connect objects to processes, expressing the dynamic system aspect—how the system changes over time. The entire system is represented by a set of hierarchically organized OPDs, such that the root OPD, called the systems diagram (SD), specifies the "bird's eye" view of the system, and lower-level OPDs specify the system in increasing levels of detail. All the OPDs in the system's OPD set are "aware" of each other, with each showing the system, or part of it, at some level of detail. The entire system is specified in its entirety by the union of the details (model facts) appearing in all the OPDs.

Object process language (OPL)

Each OPD construct (i.e., two or more things connected by one or more links) is translated to a sentence in OPL—a subset of natural English. The power of OPL lies in the fact that it is readable by humans but also interpretable by computers. These are the stages where the most important design decisions are made. The graphics-text bimodality of OPM makes it suitable to jointly model requirements by a team that involves both the customer or his domain expert on one hand, and the system architect, modelers, and designers on the other hand.

OPM model animated simulation

OPM models are not just static graphical and textual representations of the system—they are also executable. A correct OPM model constructed in OPCAT can be simulated by animating it, visually expressing how the system behaves over time to achieve its function at all detail levels. An incorrect OPM model will not execute all the way through, and will indicate where and why it is stuck, effectively serving as a visual debugger.

=== Development ===
In his foreword to Dori's book Model-Based Systems Engineering with OPM and SysML, Edward F. Crawley said:

OPM semantics was originally geared towards systems engineering, as it can model information, hardware, people, and regulation. However, in recent years OPM started to serve also researchers in molecular biology, yielding new published findings related to the mRNA lifecycle. This is a clear indication of the universality of the object-and-process ontology.

== Basics ==
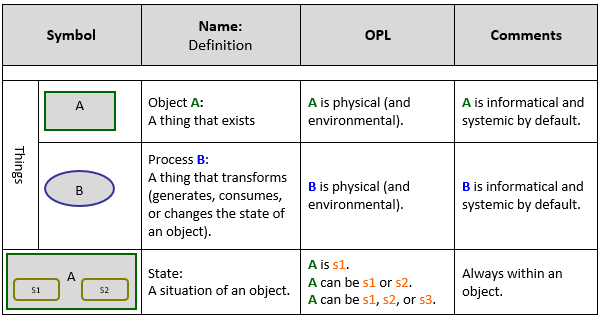
OPM entities: object, object state and process

OPM has two main parts: the language and the methodology. The language is bimodal—it is expressed in two complementary ways (modalities): the visual, graphical part—a set of one or more object-process diagrams (OPDs), and a corresponding textual part—a set of sentences in object-process language (OPL), which is a subset of English.

The top-level OPD is the system diagram (SD), which provides the context for the system's function. For man-made systems this function is expected to benefit a person or a group of people—the beneficiary. The function is the main process in SD, which also contains the objects involved in this process: the beneficiary, the operand (the object upon which the process operates), and possibly the attribute whose value the process changes.

OPM graphical elements are divided into entities, expressed as closed shapes, and relations, expressed as links that connect entities.

=== Entities ===
Entities are the building blocks of OPM. They include objects and processes, collectively called things, and object states.

Object
Associations among objects constitute the object structure of the system being modeled. In OPL text, the object name shall appear in bold face with capitalization of each word.
Object state
An object state is a particular situation classification of an object at some point during its lifetime. At every point in time, the object is in one of its states or in transition between two of its states—from its input state to its output state.
Process
A process is an expression of the pattern of transformation of objects in the system. A process does not exist in isolation; it is always associated with and occurs or happens to one or more objects. A process transforms objects by creating them, consuming them, or changing their state. Thus, processes complement objects by providing the dynamic, behavioral aspect of the system. In OPL text, the process name shall appear in bold face with capitalization of each word.

=== Links ===
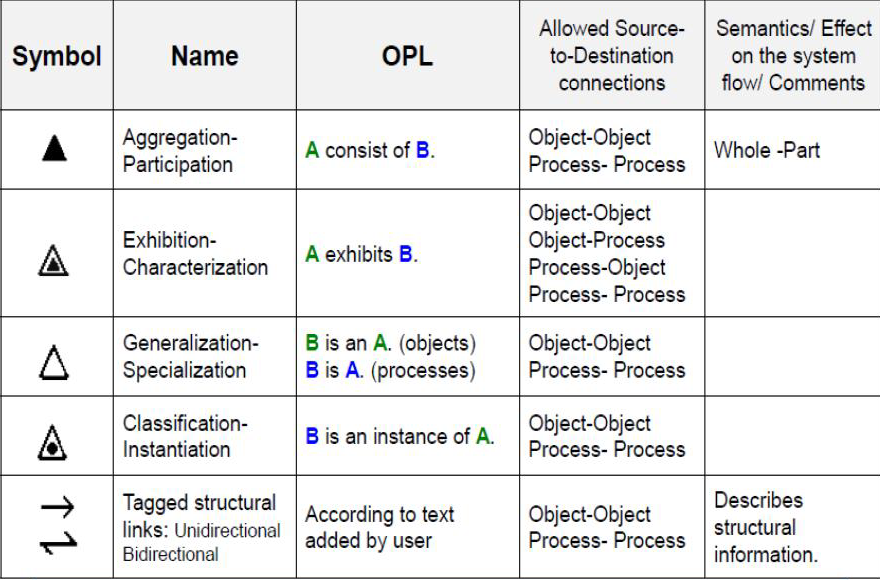
OPM structural links

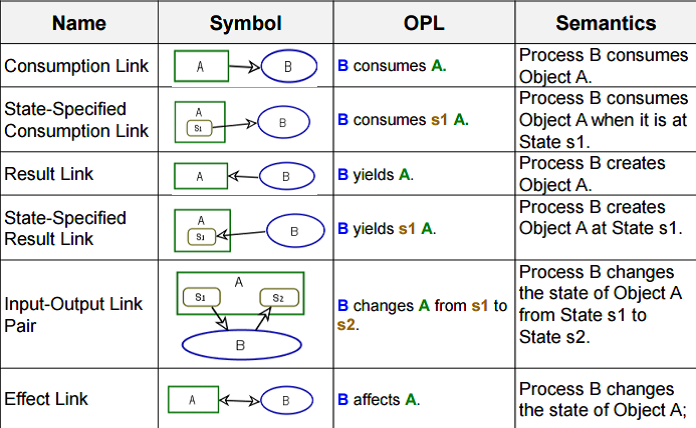
OPM procedural links

Structural link
A structural links defines a structural relation. A structural relation shall specify an association that persists in the system for at least some interval of time.
Procedural link
A procedural link defines procedural relation. A procedural relation shall specify how the system operates to attain its function, designating time dependent or conditional triggering of processes, which transform objects.
Event and condition
The Event-Condition-Action paradigm provides the OPM operational semantics and flow of control. An event is a point in time at which an object is created (or appears to be created from the system's perspective) or an object enters a specified state. At runtime, this process triggering initiates evaluation of the process precondition. Thus, starting a process execution has two prerequisites: (1) a triggering event, and (2) satisfaction of a precondition.

Once the event triggers a process, the event ceases to exist.

== Syntax and semantics ==
=== Things ===
Objects and processes are symmetric in many regards and have much in common in terms of relations, such as aggregation, generalization, and characterization.

To apply OPM in a useful manner, the modeler has to make the essential distinction between objects and processes, as a prerequisite for successful system analysis and design. By default, a noun shall identify an object.

=== Thing generic attributes ===
OPM things have three generic attributes:

1. Perseverance
2. Essence
3. Affiliation

OPM thing generic attributes have the following default values:

1. The default value of the Affiliation generic attribute of a thing is systemic.
2. System essence shall be the primary essence of the system. Like thing essence, its values are informatical and physical. Information systems, in which the majority of things are informatical, shall be primarily informatical, while systems in which the majority of things are physical shall be primarily physical.
3. The default value of the Essence generic attribute of a thing in a primarily informatical [physical] system shall be informatical [physical].

=== Object states ===
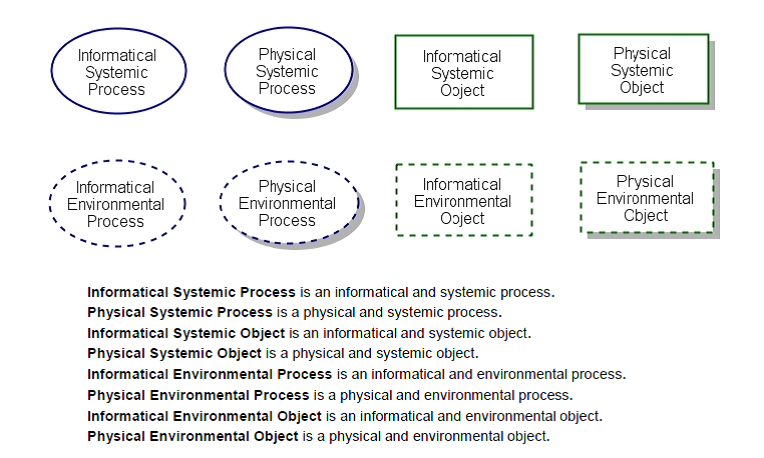
OPM things and object states

Stateful and stateless objects
Dov Dori explains in Model-Based Systems Engineering with OPM and SysML that "An object state is a possible situation in which an object may exist. An object state has meaning only in the context of the object to which it belongs." A stateless object shall be an object that has no specification of states. A stateful object shall be an object for which a set of permissible states are specified. In a runtime model, at any point in time, any stateful object instance is at a particular permissible state or in transition between two states.
Attribute values
An attribute is an object that characterizes a thing. An attribute value is a specialization of state in the sense that a value is a state of an attribute: an object has an attribute, which is a different object, to which that value is assigned for some period of time during the existence of the object exhibiting that attribute.
Object state representation
A state is graphically defined by a labelled, rounded-corner rectangle placed inside the owning object. It can not live without an object. In OPL text, the state name shall appear in bold face without capitalization.
Initial, default, and final states
Initial, final, and default state representation
A state that is initial is graphically defined by a state representation with thick contour. A state that is final is graphically defined by a state representation with double contour. A state that is default is graphically defined by a state representation with an open arrow pointing diagonally from the left. The corresponding OPL sentences shall include explicit indicators for an initial, final or default state.

=== Links ===
==== Procedural links ====
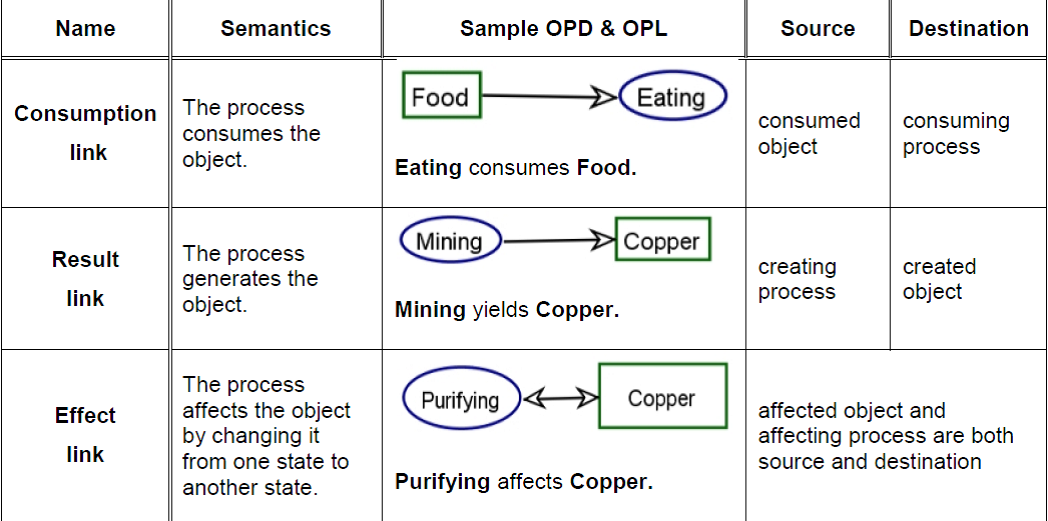
OPM Transforming Links

A procedural link is one of three kinds:

1. Transforming link, which connects a transformer (an object that the process transforms) or its state with a process to model object transformation, namely generation, consumption, or state change of that object as a result of the process execution.
2. Enabling link, which connects an enabler (an object that enables the process occurrence but is not transformed by that process) or its state, to a process, which enables the occurrence of that process.
3. Control link, which is a procedural (transforming or enabling) link with a control modifier—the letter e (for event) or c (for condition), which adds semantics of a control element. The letter e signifies an event for triggering the linked process, while the letter c signifies a condition for execution of the linked process, or connection of two processes denoting invocation, or exception.

Procedural link uniqueness OPM principle
A process needs to transform at least one object. Hence, a process shall be connected via a transforming link to at least one object or object state. At any particular extent of abstraction, an object or any one of its states shall have exactly one role as a model element with respect to a process to which it links: the object may be a transformee or an enabler. Additionally, it can be a trigger for an event (if it has the control modifier e), or a conditioning object (if it has the control modifier c), or both.
State-specified procedural links
A state-specified procedural link is a detailed version of its procedural link counterpart in that rather than connecting a process to an object, it connects a process to a specific state of that object.

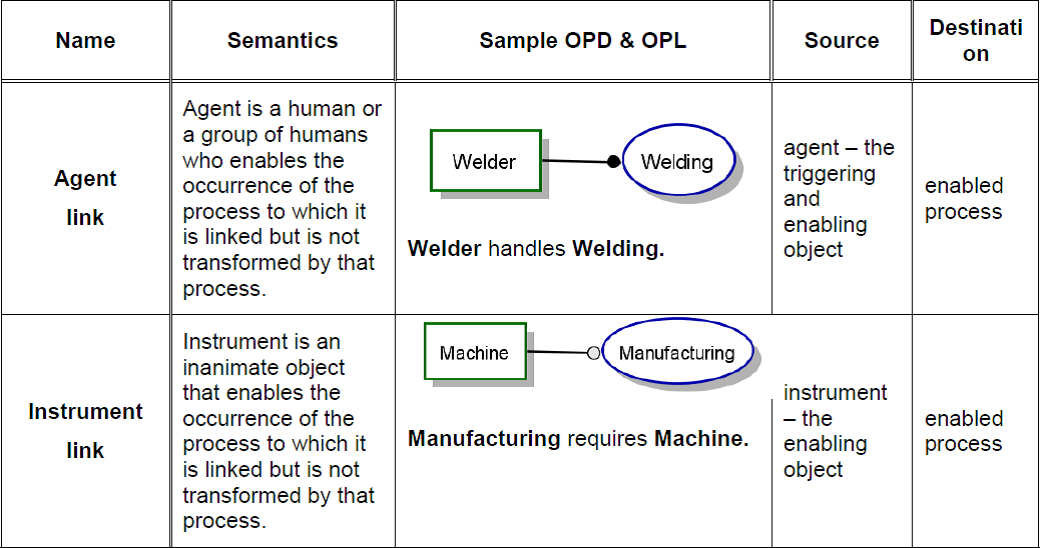
OPM enabling links

Transforming links
The three kinds of transforming links are:

1. Consumption link: Graphically, an arrow with a closed arrowhead pointing from the consumee to the consuming process defines the consumption link. By assumption, the consumed object disappears as soon as the process begins execution. The syntax of a consumption link OPL sentence is: Processing consumes Consumee.
2. Effect link: A transforming link specifying that the linked process affects the linked object, which is the affectee, i.e., the process causes some unspecified change in the state of the affectee. Graphically, a bidirectional arrow with two closed arrowheads, one pointing in each direction between the affecting process and the affected object, shall define the effect link. The syntax of an effect link OPL sentence is: Processing affects Affectee.
3. Result link: Graphically, an arrow with a closed arrowhead pointing from the creating process to the resultee shall define a result link. The syntax of a result link OPL sentence is: Processing yields Resultee.

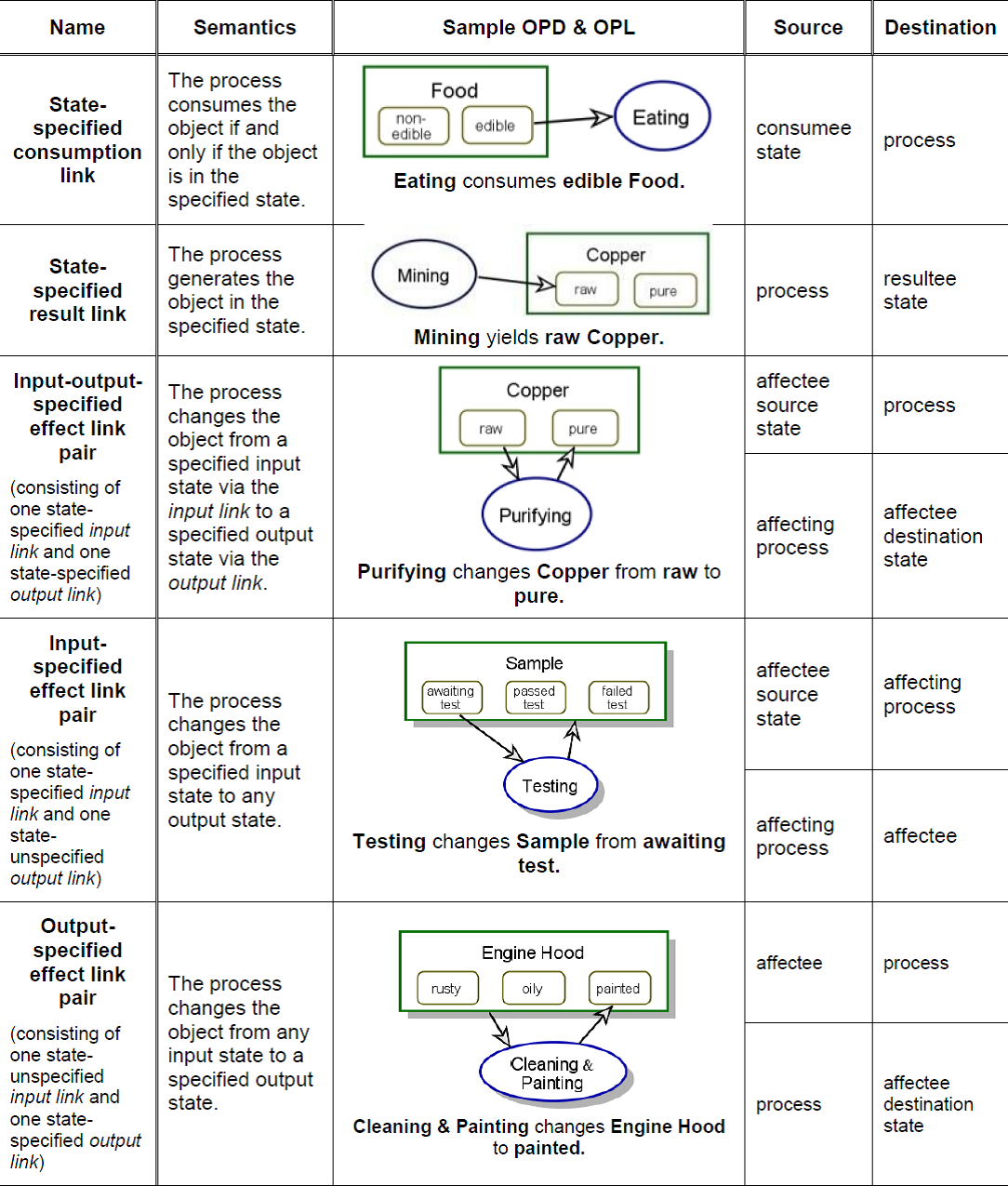
OPM state-specified transforming links

Enabling links
An enabling link is a procedural link specifying an enabler for a process—an object that must be present for that process to occur, but the existence and state of that object after the process is complete are the same as just before the process began. The two kinds of enabling links are:

1. Agent and agent link: A human or a group of humans capable of intelligent decision-making, who enable a process by interacting with the system to enable or control the process throughout execution. Graphically, a line with a filled circle ("black lollipop") at the terminal end extending from the agent object to the process it enables defines an agent link. The syntax of an agent link OPL sentence is: Agent handles Processing.
2. Instrument and instrument link: An inanimate or otherwise non-decision-making enabler of a process that cannot start or take place without the existence and availability of the instrument.

State-specified transforming links

1. State-specified consumption link: A consumption link that originates from a particular state of the consumee, meaning that the consumee must be in that state for it to be consumed by the process to which it is linked. Graphically, an arrow with a closed arrowhead pointing from the particular object state to the process, which consumes the object, defines the state-specified consumption link.
2. State-specified result link: A result link that terminates at a specific state of the resultee, meaning that the resultee shall be in that resultant state upon its construction. Graphically, an arrow with a closed arrowhead pointing from the process to the particular object state defines the state-specified result link. The syntax OPL sentence is: Process yields qualified-state Object.
3. State-specified effect links:
  - Input and output effect links- An input link is the link from the object's input state to the transforming process, while the output link is the link from the transforming process to the object's output state.
  - Input-output-specified effect link: A pair of effect links, where the input link originates from a particular state of the affectee and the output link originates from that process and terminates at the output state of the same affectee. Graphically, a pair of arrows with a closed arrowhead from the input state of the affectee to the affecting process and a similar arrow from that process to the state of the affectee at process terminates defines the input-output-specified effect link. The syntax OPL sentence is: Process changes Object from input-state to output-state.
  - Input-specified effect link: A pair of effect links, where the input link originates from a particular state of the affectee and the output link originates from that process and terminates at the affectee without specifying a particular state. Graphically, a pair of arrows consisting of an arrow with a closed arrowhead from a particular state—the input state—of the affectee to the process, and a similar arrow from that process to the affectee but not to any one of its states defines the input-specified effect link. The syntax OPL sentence is: Process changes Object from input-state.
  - Output-specified effect link: A pair of effect links, where the input (source) link originates from an affectee, and the output link originates from the process and terminates at the output (destination, resultant) state of the same affectee. Graphically, a pair of arrows consisting of an arrow with a closed arrowhead from the affectee, but not from any one of its states, to the affecting process, and a similar arrow from that process to a particular state of that affectee— the output state— defines the output-specified effect link.

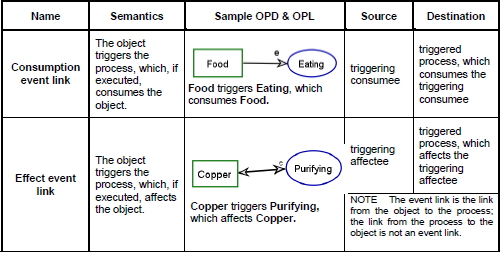
OPM basic transforming event links

State-specified enabling links
Originate from a specific qualifying state and terminate at a process, meaning that the process may occur if and only if the object exists at the state from which the link originates.

1. State-specified agent link: Graphically, a line with a filled circle ("black lollipop") at the terminal end extending from the qualifying state of the agent object to the process it enables defines a state-specified agent link. The syntax OPL sentence is: Qualifying-state Agent handles Processing.
2. State-specified instrument link: An instrument link that originates from a specific qualifying state of the instrument. Graphically, a line with an empty circle ("white lollipop") at the terminal end extending from the qualifying state of the instrument object to the process it enables defines a state-specified instrument link. The syntax OPL sentence is: Processing requires qualifying-state instrument.

==== Event-Condition-Action control ====
Preprocess object set and process precondition
In order for an OPM process to start executing once it has been triggered, it needs a set of objects comprising one or more consumes, some possibly at specific states, and/or affects, collectively called the preprocess object set. At instance-level execution, each consume B in the pre-process object set of process P shall be consumed and stop to exist at the beginning of the lowest level sub-process of P which consumes B. Each affected (an object whose state changes) B in the preprocess object set of process P shall exit from its input state at the beginning of the lowest level sub-process of P.

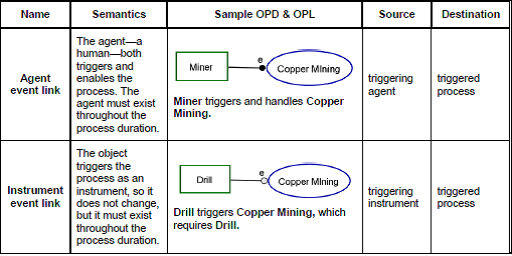
OPM basic enabling event links

Post-process object set and process post-condition
A set of objects, comprising one or more results, some possibly at given states, and/or affects, collectively called the post-process object set, shall result from executing a process and carrying out the transformations associated with its execution. Each resulted B in the post process object set of process P shall be created and start to exist at the end of the lowest level sub process of P which yields B. Each affected B in the post-process object set of process P shall enter its output state at the end of the lowest level sub-process of P.

==== Control links ====
An event link and a condition link express an event and a condition, respectively. Control links occur either between an object and a process or between two processes.

Event links
Triggering a process initiates an attempt to execute the process, but it does not guarantee success of this attempt. The triggering event forces an evaluation of the process' precondition for satisfaction, which, if and only if satisfied, allows process execution to proceed and the process becomes active. Regardless of whether the precondition is satisfied or not, the event will be lost. If the precondition is not satisfied, process execution will not occur until another event activates the process and a successful precondition evaluation allows the process to execute.

1. Basic transforming event links: A consumption event link is a link between an object and a process, which an instance of the object activates.
  - Consumption event link: Graphically, an arrow with a closed arrowhead pointing from the object to the process with the small letter e (for event). The syntax of a consumption event link OPL sentence is: Object triggers Process, which consumes Object.
  - Effect event link: Graphically, a bidirectional arrow with closed arrowheads at each end between the object and the process with a small letter e (for event). The syntax of an effect event link OPL sentence is: Object triggers Process, which affects Object.
1. Basic enabling event links:
  - Agent event link: An agent event link is an enabling link from an agent object to the process that it activates and enables. Graphically, a line with a filled circle ("black lollipop") at the terminal end extending from an agent object to the process it activates and enables with a small letter e (for event). The syntax of an agent event link OPL sentence is: Agent triggers and handles Process.
  - Instrument event link: Graphically, a line with an empty circle ("white lollipop') at the terminal end extending from the instrument object to the process it activates and enables with a small letter e (for event). The syntax of an instrument event link OPL sentence is: Instrument triggers Process, which requires Instrument.
2. State-specified transforming event links:
  - State-specified consumption event link: A state-specified consumption event link is a consumption link that originates from a specific state of an object and terminates at a process, which an instance of the object activates. Graphically, an arrow with a closed arrowhead pointing from the object state to the process with the small letter e (for event). The syntax of a state-specified consumption event link OPL sentence is: Specified-state Object triggers Process, which consumes Object.
  - Input-output-specified effect event link: An input-output-specified effect event link is an input-output-specified effect link with the additional meaning of activating the affecting process when the object enters the specified input state. Graphically, the input-output-specified effect link with a small letter e (for event). The syntax of an input-output specified effect event link OPL sentence is: Input-state Object triggers Process, which changes Object from input-state to output-state.
  - Input-specified effect event link: An input-specified effect event link is an input-specified effect link with the additional meaning of activating the affecting process when the object enters the specified input state. Graphically, the input-specified effect link with a small letter e (for event. The syntax of an input-specified effect event link OPL sentence is: Input-state Object triggers Process, which changes Object from input-state.
  - Output-specified effect event link: An output-specified effect event link is an output-specified effect link with the additional meaning of activating the affecting process when the object comes into existence. Graphically, the output-specified effect link with a small letter e (for event). The syntax of an output-specified effect event link OPL sentence is: Object in any state triggers Process, which changes Object to destination-state
3. State-specified agent event link:
  - State-specified agent event link: A state-specified agent event link is a state-specified agent link with the additional meaning of activating the process when the agent enters the specified state. Graphically, the state-specified agent link with a small letter e (for event). The syntax of a state-specified agent event link OPL sentence is: Qualifying-state Agent triggers and handles Processing".
  - State-specified instrument event link: A state-specified instrument event link is a state-specified instrument link with the additional meaning of activating the process when the instrument enters the specified state. Graphically, the state-specified instrument link with a small letter e (for event). The syntax of a state-specified instrument event link OPL sentence is: Qualifying-state Instrument triggers Processing, which requires qualifying-state Instrument."

Invocation links

1. Process invocation
2. Self-invocation link
3. Implicit invocation link: Implicit invocation occurs upon sub-process termination within the context of an in-zoomed process, at which time the sub-process invokes the one(s) immediately below it. Graphically, there is no link between the invoking and the invoked sub-processes; their relative heights within the in-zoom context of their ancestor process implies this semantics.

Condition links
A condition link is a procedural link between a source object or object state and a destination process that provides a bypass mechanism.

1. Condition consumption link: A condition consumption link is a condition link from an object to a process, meaning that if in run-time an object instance exists, then the process precondition is satisfied, the process executes and consumes the object instance. Graphically, an arrow with a closed arrowhead pointing from the object to the process with the small letter c (for condition) near the arrowhead shall denote a condition consumption link.
2. Condition effect link: However, if that object instance does not exist, then the process precondition evaluation fails and the control skips the process. Graphically, a bidirectional arrow with two closed arrowheads, one pointing in each direction between the affected object and the affecting process, with the small letter c (for condition) near the process end of the arrow.
3. Condition agent link: Graphically, a line with a filled circle ('black lollipop") at the terminal end extending from an agent object to the process it enables, with the small letter c (for condition) near the process end. The syntax of the condition agent link OPL sentence is: Agent handles Process if Agent exists, else Process is skipped.
4. Condition instrument link: Graphically, a line with an empty circle ("white lollipop") at the terminal end, extending from an instrument object to the process it enables, with the small letter c (for condition) near the process end, shall denote a condition instrument link. The syntax of the condition instrument link OPL sentence shall be: Process occurs if Instrument exists, else Process is skipped.
5. Condition state-specified consumption link: A condition state-specified consumption link is a condition consumption link that originates from a specified state of an object and terminates at a process, meaning that if an object instance exists in the specified state and the rest of the process precondition is satisfied, then the process executes and consumes the object instance. Graphically, an arrow with a closed arrowhead pointing from the object qualifying state to the process with the small letter c (for condition) near the arrowhead.
6. Condition input-output-specified effect link: A condition input-output-specified effect link is an input-output specified effect link with the additional meaning that if at run-time an object instance exists and it is in the process input state (and assuming that the rest of the process precondition is satisfied), then the process executes and affects the object instance. Graphically, the condition input-output-specified effect link with the small letter c (for condition) near the arrowhead of the input. The syntax of the condition input-output-specified effect link OPL sentence is: Process occurs if Object is input-state, in which case Process changes Object from input-state to output-state, otherwise Process is skipped.
7. Condition input-specified effect link: A condition input specified effect link is an input-specified effect link with the additional meaning that if at run-time an object instance exists in the specified input state and the rest of the process precondition is satisfied, then the process executes and affects the object instance by changing its state from its input state to an unspecified state. However, if that object instance does not exist at the input state, then the process precondition evaluation fails and the control skips the process. Graphically, the condition input-specified effect link with the small letter c (for condition) near the arrowhead of the input link. The syntax of a condition input-specified effect link OPL sentence is: Process occurs if Object is input state, in which case Process changes Object from input-state, otherwise Process is skipped.
8. Condition output-specified effect link: A condition output-specified effect link is an output-specified effect link with the additional meaning that if at run-time an object instance exists and the rest of the process precondition is satisfied, then the process executes and affects the object instance by changing its state to the specified output-state. However, if that object instance does not exist, then the process precondition evaluation fails and the control skips the process. Graphically, the condition output-specified effect link with the small letter c (for condition) near the arrowhead of the input link. The syntax of the condition output-specified effect OPL sentence is: Process occurs if Object exists, in which case Process changes Object to output-state, otherwise Process is skipped.
9. Condition state-specified agent link: The syntax of the condition state-specified agent link OPL sentence is: Agent handles Process if Agent is qualifying-state, else Process is skipped.
10. Condition state-specified instrument link

More information and examples can be found in Model-Based Systems Engineering with OPM and SysML, Chapter 13 "The Dynamic System Aspect".

==== Structural links ====
Structural links specify static, time-independent, long-lasting relations in the system. A structural link connects two or more objects or two or more processes, but not an object and a process, except in the case of an exhibition-characterization link.

Unidirectional tagged structural link
Has a user-defined semantics regarding the nature of the relation from one thing to the other. Graphically, an arrow with an open arrowhead. Along the tagged structural link, the modeler should record a meaningful tag in the form of a textual phrase that expresses the nature of the structural relation between the connected objects (or processes) and makes sense when placed in the OPL sentence whose syntax follows.
Unidirectional null-tagged structural link
A unidirectional tagged structural link with no tag. In this case, the default unidirectional tag is used. The modeler has the option of setting the default unidirectional tag for a specific system or a set of systems. If no default is defined, the default tag is "relates to".
Bidirectional tagged structural link
When the tags in both directions are meaningful and not just the inverse of each other, they may be recorded by two tags on either side of a single bidirectional tagged structural link. The syntax of the resulting tagged structural link is two separate tagged structural link OPL sentences, one for each direction. Graphically, a line with harpoon shaped arrowheads on opposite sides at both ends of the link's line shall.
Reciprocal tagged structural link
A bidirectional tagged structural link with one tag. In either case, reciprocity indicate that the tag of a bidirectional structural link has the same semantics for its forward and backward directions. When no tag appears, the default tag shall be "are related". The syntax of the reciprocal tagged structural link with only one tag shall be: Source-thing and destination thing are reciprocity-tag. The syntax of the reciprocal tagged structural link with no tag is: Source thing and Destination-thing are related.
Fundamental structural relations
The most prevalent structural relations among OPM things and are of particular significance for specifying and understanding systems. Each of the fundamental relations is elaborate or refine one OPM thing, the source thing, or refinee, into a collection of one or more OPM things, the destination thing or things, or refineables.
Aggregation-participation link
A refinee—the whole—aggregates one or more other refineables—the parts. Graphically, a black solid (filled in) triangle with its apex connecting by a line to the whole and the parts connecting by lines to the opposite horizontal base shall denote the aggregation-participation relation link.
Exhibition-characterization link
A thing exhibits, or is characterized by, another thing. The exhibition-characterization relation binds a refinee—the exhibitor—with one or more refineables, which shall identify features that characterize the exhibitor Graphically, a smaller black triangle inside a larger empty triangle with that larger triangle's apex connecting by a line to the exhibitor and the features connecting to the opposite (horizontal) base defines the exhibition-characterization relation link.
Generalization-specialization and inheritance
These are structural relations which provide for abstracting any number of objects or process classes into superclasses, and assigning attributes of superclasses to subordinate classes.

1. Generalization-specialization link
2. Inheritance through specialization
3. Specialization restriction through discriminating attribute: A subset of the possible values of an inherited attribute may restrict the specialization.

Classification-instantiation and system execution

1. Classification-instantiation link: A source thing, which is an object class or a process class connect to one or more destination things, which are valued instances of the source thing's pattern, i.e. the features specified by the pattern acquire explicit values. This relation provides the modeler with an explicit mechanism for expressing the relationship between a class and its instances created by the provision of feature values. Graphically, a small black circle inside an otherwise empty larger triangle with apex connecting by a line to the class thing and the instance things connecting by lines to the opposite base defines the classification-instantiation relation link. The syntax is: Instance-thing is an instance of Class-thing.
2. Instances of object class and process class

State-specified structural relations and links

1. State-specified characterization relation and link: An exhibition-characterization relation from a specialized object that exhibits a value for a discriminating attribute of that object, meaning that the specialized object shall have only that value. Graphically, the exhibition-characterization link triangular symbol, with its apex connecting to the specialized object and its opposite base connecting to the value, defines the state-specified characterization relation. The syntax is: Specialized-object exhibits value-name Attribute-Name.
2. State-specified tagged structural relations and links: A structural relation between a state of an object or value of an attribute and another object or its state or value, meaning that these two entities are associated with the tag expressing the semantics of the association. In case of a null tag (i.e., the tag is not specified), the corresponding default null tag is used. Three groups of state-specified tagged structural relations exist: (1) source state-specified tagged structural relation, (2) destination state-specified tagged structural relation, (3) source-and-destination state-specified tagged structural relation. Each of these groups includes the appropriate unidirectional, bidirectional, and reciprocal tagged structural relation, giving rise to seven kinds of state-specified tagged structural relation link and corresponding OPL sentences.

More information and examples can be found in Model-Based Systems Engineering with OPM and SysML, Chapter 3.3 "Adding structural links".

=== Relationship cardinalities ===
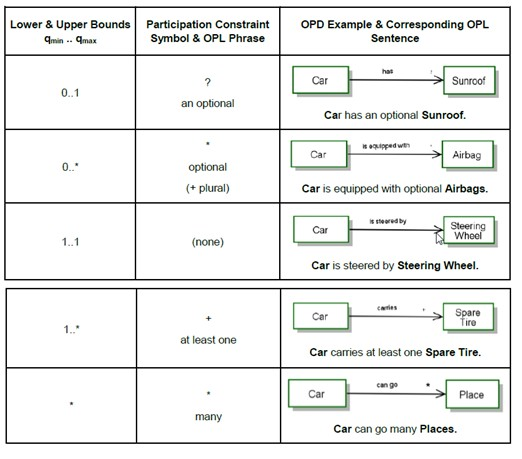
Link cardinalities summary

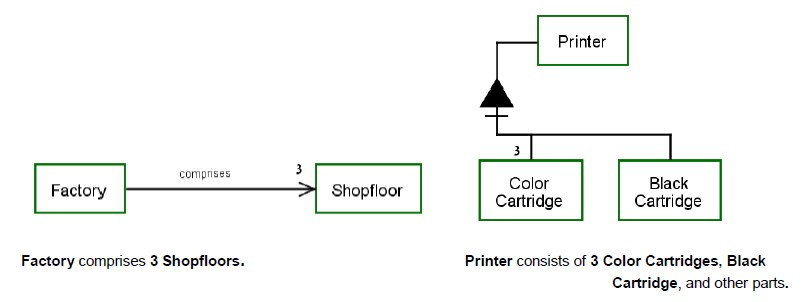
Object multiplicity in structural and procedural links

Object multiplicity in structural and procedural links

Object multiplicity shall refer to a requirement or constraint specification on the quantity or count of object instances associated with a link. Unless a multiplicity specification is present, each end of a link shall specify only one thing instance. The syntax of an OPL sentence that includes an object with multiplicity shall include the object multiplicity preceding the object name, with the object name appearing in its plural form. Multiplicity specifications may appear in the following cases:

1. to specify multiple source or destination object instances for a tagged structural link of any kind;
2. to specify a participant object with multiple instances in an aggregation-participation link, where a different participation specification may be attached to each one of the parts of the whole;
3. to specify an object with multiple instances in a procedural relation.

Object multiplicity expressions and constraints

Object multiplicity may include arithmetic expressions, which shall use the operator symbols "+", "–", "*", "/", "(", and ")" with their usual semantics and shall use the usual textual correspondence in the corresponding OPL sentences.

An integer or an arithmetic expression may constrain object multiplicity. Graphically, expression constraints shall appear after a semicolon separating them from the expression that they constrain and shall use the equality/inequality symbols "=", "<", ">", "<=", and ">=", the curly braces "{" and "}" for enclosing set members, and the membership operator "in" (element of, ∈), all with their usual semantics. The corresponding OPL sentence shall place the constraint phrase in bold letters after the object to which the constraint applies in the form ", where constraint".

Attribute value and multiplicity constraints

The expression of object multiplicity for structural and procedural links specifies integer values or parameter symbols that resolve to integer values. In contrast, the values associated with attributes of objects or processes may be integer or real values, or parameter symbols that resolve to integer or real values, as well as character strings and enumerated values. Graphically, a labelled, rounded-corner rectangle placed inside the attribute to which it belongs shall denote an attribute value with the value or value range (integers, real numbers, or string characters) corresponding to the label name. In OPL text, the attribute value shall appear in bold face without capitalization.

The syntax for an object with an attribute value OPL sentence shall be: Attribute of Object is value.

The syntax for an object with an attribute value range OPL sentence shall be: Attribute of Object range is value-range. A structural or a procedural link connecting with an attribute that has a real number value may specify a relationship constraint, which is distinct from an object multiplicity.

Graphically, an attribute value constraint is an annotation by a number, integer or real, or a symbol parameter, near the attribute end of the link and aligning with the link.

=== Logical operators: AND, XOR, and OR ===
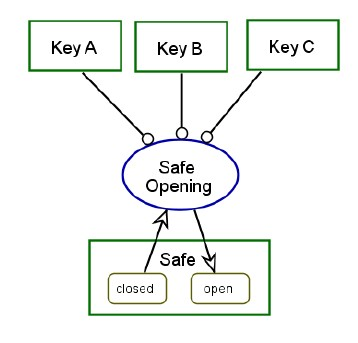
Logical AND procedural links

Logical AND procedural links

The logical operators AND, XOR, and OR among procedural relations enable specification of elaborate process precondition and postcondition. Separate, non-touching links shall have the semantics of logical AND. Here, unlocking the safe requires all three keys.

Logical XOR and OR procedural links

A link fan shall follow the semantics of either a XOR or an OR operator. The link fan end that is common to the links shall be the convergent link end. The link end that is not common to the links shall be the divergent link end.

The XOR operator shall mean that exactly one of the things in the span of the link fan exists, if the divergent link end has objects, or happens, if the divergent link end has processes. Graphically, a dashed arc across the links in the link fan with the arc focal point at the convergent end point of contact shall denote the XOR operator.

The OR operator shall mean that at least one of the two or more things in the span of the link fan exists, if the divergent link end has objects, or happens, if the divergent end has processes. Graphically, two concentric dashed arcs across the links with their focal point at the convergent end point of contact shall denote the OR operator.

State-specified XOR and OR link fans

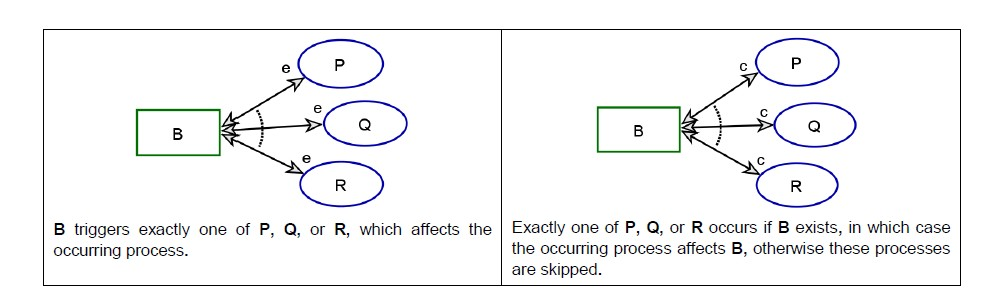
Control-modified link fans

Control-modified link fans

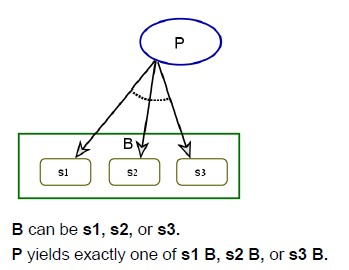
Link probabilities and probabilistic link fans

Link probabilities and probabilistic link fans

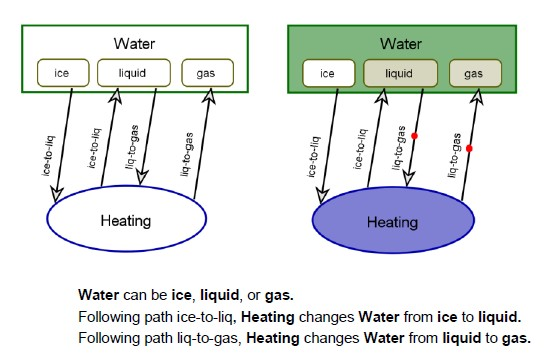
Execution path and path labels

Execution path and path labels
A path label shall be a label along a procedural link, which, in the case that there is more than one option to follow upon process termination, prescribes that the link to follow will be the one having the same label as the one which we entered the process.

== Modeling principles and model comprehension ==
The definition of system purpose, scope, and function in terms of boundary, stakeholders and preconditions is the basis for determining whether other elements should appear in the model. This determines the scope of the system model. OPM provides abstracting and refining mechanisms to manage the expression of model clarity and completeness.

Stakeholder and system's beneficiary identification

For man-made systems this function is expected to benefit a person or a group of people—the beneficiary. After the function of the system aligns with the functional value expectation of its main beneficiary, the modeler identifies and adds other principal stakeholders to the OPM model.

System diagram

The resulting top-level OPD is the system diagram (SD), which includes the stakeholder group, in particular the beneficiary group, and additional top-level environmental things, which provide the context for the system's operation. The SD should contain only the central and important things—those things indispensable for understanding the function and context of the system. The function is the main process in SD, which also contains the objects involved in this process: the beneficiary, the operand (the object upon which the process operates), and possibly the attribute of the operand whose value the process changes. SD should also contain an object representing the system that enables the function. The default name of this system is created by adding the word "System" to the name of the function. For example, if the function is Car Painting, the name of the system would be Car Painting System.

OPD tree

Clarity and completeness trade-off

Establishing an appropriate balance requires careful management of context during model development. However, the modeler may take advantage of the union of information provided by the entire OPD set of an OPM system model and have one OPD which is clear and unambiguous but not complete, and another that focuses on completeness for some smaller part of the system by adding more details.

Refinement-abstraction mechanisms

OPM shall provide abstracting and refining mechanisms to manage the expression of model clarity and completeness. These mechanisms shall enable presenting and viewing the system, and the things that comprise it, in various contexts that are interrelated by the objects, processes and relations that are common amongst them.

State expression and state suppression

The inverse of state suppression shall be state expression, i.e., refining the OPD by adding the information concerning possible object states. The OPL corresponding to the OPD shall express only the states of the objects that are depicted.

Unfolding and folding

It reveals a set of things that are hierarchically below the unfolded thing. The result is a hierarchy tree, the root of which is the unfolded thing. Linked to the root are the things that constitute the context of the unfolded thing. Conversely, folding is a mechanism for abstraction or composition, which applies to an unfolded hierarchical tree.

In-zooming and out-zooming

In-zooming is a kind of unfolding, which is applicable to aggregation-participation only and has additional semantics. For processes, in-zooming enables modeling the sub-processes, their temporal order, their interactions with objects, and passing of control to and from this context. For objects, in-zooming creates a distinct context that enables modeling the constituent objects spatial or logical order. Graphically, the timeline within the context of an in-zoomed process flows from the top of its process ellipse symbol to the ellipse bottom.

== Meta modeling ==
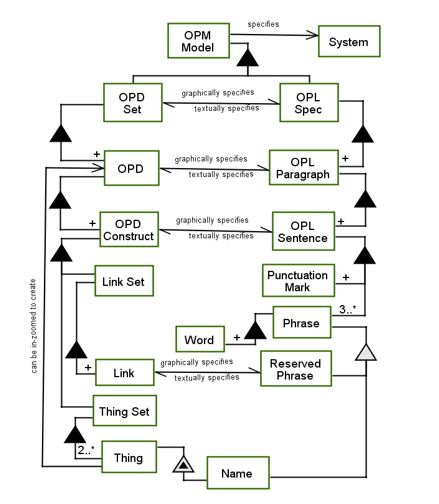
OPM model structure

OPM model structure

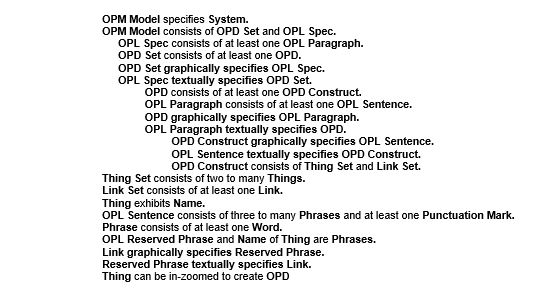
OPM model structure—OPL

Model of OPD Construct and Basic Construct

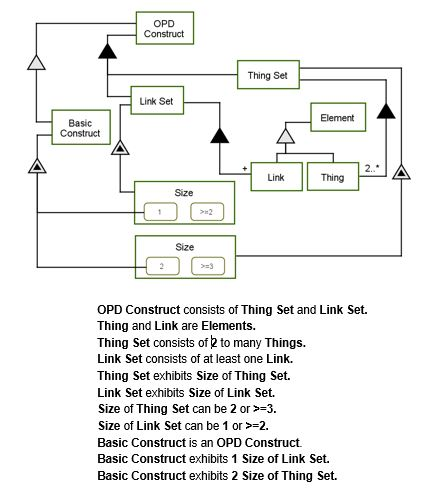
OPD model

The model, as seen in the image of OPD metamodel, elaborates the OPD Construct concept. The purpose of this model is to distinguish Basic Construct from another possible OPD Construct. A Basic Construct is a specialization of OPD Construct, which consists of exactly two Things connected by exactly one Link. The non-basic constructs include, among others, those with link fans or more than two refinees.

A modeller could add a process to the model, by adding states disconnected and connected of Thing Set. The purpose of the model thus includes the action of transforming a disconnected Thing Set to a connected Thing Set using the Link Set as an instrument of connection.

OPM model of Thing

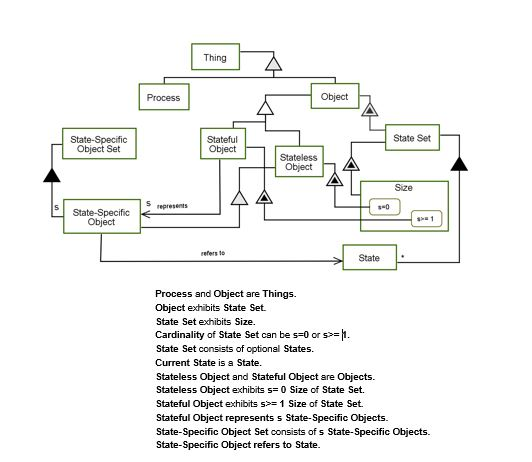
OPM model of Thing

OPM model of Thing, is a model for an OPM Thing, showing its specialization into Object and Process, as depicted in the image of model of thing below. A set of States characterize Object, which can be empty, in a Stateless Object, or non-empty in the case of a Stateful Object.

A Stateful Object with s States gives rise to a set of s stateless State-Specific Objects, one for each State. A particular State-Specific Object refers to an object in a specific state. Modelling the concept of State-Specific Object as both an Object and a State enables simplifying the conceptual model by referring to an object and any one or its states by simply specifying Object.

OPM model of Thing generic properties

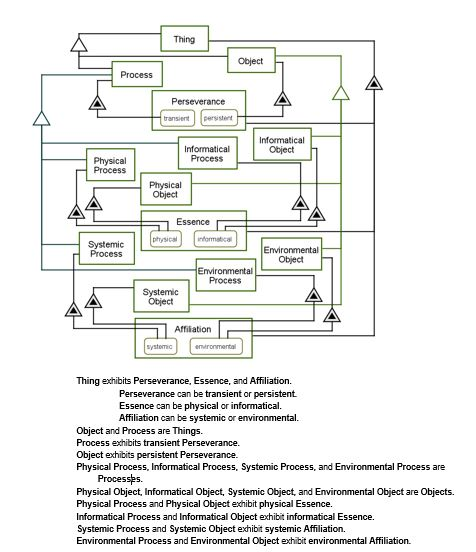
OPM model of Thing generic properties

OPM model of Thing generic properties, depicts Thing and its Perseverance, Essence, and Affiliation generic properties modelled as attribute refinees of an exhibition-characterization link. Perseverance is the discriminating attribute between Object and Process.

In-zooming and out-zooming models

Both new-diagram in-zooming and new-diagram out-zooming create a new OPD context from an existing OPD context. New-diagram in-zooming starts with an OPD of relatively less details and adds elaboration or refinement as a descendant OPD that applies to a specific thing in the less detailed OPD.

== Versions ==
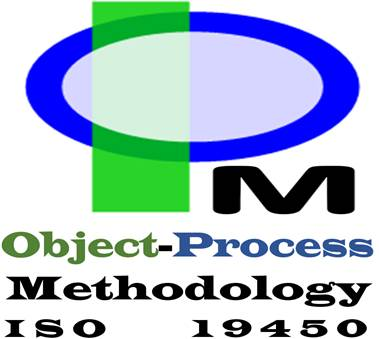
OPM logo

OPM

The current version of OPM is ISO/PAS 19450:2015 as specified in Automation Systems and Integration — Object-Process Methodology. The specification in Dori's 2016 book is a superset of ISO/PAS 19450:2015.

The previous version of OPM was specified in Dori's 2002 book.

OPCAT

The current OPCAT version is 4.1. It is available freely from Technion's Enterprise Systems Modeling Laboratory.

A previous OPCAT version, 3.1, with fewer capabilities, is also available from the same site. Both are coded in Java. The first OPCAT version, OPCAT 1.X, was written in Visual C++ in 1998.

In the beginning of 2016 a team of students under the management of Dori began working on the new generation of OPCAT which will be called OPCloud. As suggested by the name of the software, it will be a cloud-based application, and will enable users to create OPM models using a web-based application.

== Standardization ==
ISO—the International Organization for Standardization—is an independent, non-governmental international organization with a membership of 162 national standards bodies, which develops voluntary, consensus-based, market relevant International Standards that support innovation and provide solutions to global challenges. These standards provide world-class specifications for products, services and systems, to ensure quality, safety and efficiency.

=== ISO and OPM ===
In June 2008, Richard Martin approached Dov Dori after his presentation at the INCOSE International Symposium in Utrecht, the Netherlands, to inquire about the possibility of creating an International Standard for OPM. Martin, convener of ISO TC184/SC5/WG1 for automation systems interoperability architecture and modelling, had for some time been searching for methodologies offering more than static information and process modeling. He provided Dori with a simple example to model that could demonstrate both the modelling capability of OPM and its dynamic simulation opportunity.

In May 2010, Dori presented a brief overview of OPM and his demonstration model at the ISO Technical Committee 184/Sub-Committee 5 (TC184/SC5) plenary meeting, which then adopted a resolution to create an OPM Study Group for the purpose of examining the potential for OPM to enhance the standards created by SC5.

The OPM Study Group began its work in October 2010 and issued an interim report for the 2011 SC5 Plenary. The report included several uses of OPM to model existing SC5 standards and led to an initial motivation for the standardization of OPM with the realization that being text-based, ISO standards are prone to suffer from inconsistencies and incomplete information. This deficiency could be significantly reduced if the standards were model-based rather than text-based, and OPM offered a useful underlying modeling paradigm for this purpose.

A final OPM Study Group Report and a draft for a metamodel for model-based standards authoring document were delivered at the 2012 SC5 Plenary. As the OPM Study Group effort progressed, it became obvious that OPM could also serve as a solid and comprehensive basis for model-based systems engineering (MBSE) and for modeling both natural and man-made systems.

=== ISO 19450 Document ===
TC184/SC5/WG1 participants received the first draft of the OPM PAS in September 2011 with 16 pages, 2 annexes and a bibliography for a total of 25 pages. Most of the content simply identified sub-clause headings and space holder graphics. By the 2012 SC5 Plenary, the PAS draft included 10 full clauses describing OPM features and 6 annexes totaling 86 pages. One annex was an EBNF (Extended Backus-Naur Form, used to formally specify context free languages, enabling parsing of programming languages) specification for OPL and another detailed OPD graph grammar. To facilitate verification of the EBNF specification, David Shorter wrote a script to evaluate consistency and completeness of the EBNF statement set. Further effort to add meaningful examples and complete all of the identified sections resulted in a draft of 138 pages by the time of the 2013 SC5 Plenary. Subsequently, the working draft was registered with the SC5 Secretariat as a Committee Draft for initial circulation to SC5 members.

Because the SC5 resolution calling for the OPM specification indicated that the document was to be registered as a Publicly Available Specification (PAS), it would have only one acceptance ballot opportunity. In April 2014, the New Work Item Proposal and revised Committee Draft for ISO/PAS 19450 was delivered to SC5 for consideration. By now the Committee Draft was 98 pages plus front matter, four annexes and 30 bibliographic references, totaling 183 pages. In March 2015, ISO registered the result of balloting for ISO/PAS 19450 as 8 Approve, 1 Approve with comments, and 1 abstain.

ISO/PAS 19450 was formally published with a total of 162 pages by ISO on December 15, 2015, culminating a six-year effort to provide the standardization community with a formal specification for a new approach to modeling that binds together graphics and textual representations into a single paradigm suitable for automated simulation of model behavior.

== OPM vs. SysML and UML ==
OPM vs. SysML

SysML is defined as an extension of the Unified Modeling Language (UML) using UML's profile mechanism.

OPM vs. UML

The differences between OPM and UML are highly perceivable during the analysis and design stages. While UML is a multi-model, OPM supports a single unifying structure-behavior model. The crucial differences stem from the structure-oriented approach of UML, in which behavior is spread over thirteen diagram types, a fact that inevitably invokes the model multiplicity problem. First, using the OPM approach enables to view at main diagram (SD) the main process, objects and the connection between them. In addition, it is easy to understand what is the main system's benefit (presented at the SD). In OPM, it's also easier to understand the main three aspects of the system: behavior, structure and functionality (contrary to UML which describes these aspects with different types of diagrams). Database unfolding modeling contributes to the understanding of system and all details which is stored in the system. In addition, creating in-zooming enables simplifying the model. OPM requires extensive knowledge of systematic processes such as how the system saved the path and gets decisions.

== Generating SysML views from an OPM model ==
While both languages aim at the same purpose of providing a means for general-purpose systems engineering, these languages take different approaches in realizing this goal. SysML is a profile of UML (Unified Modeling Language).

The OPM-to SysML translation is one-to-many in the sense that a single OPM element (entity or link) usually translates to several SysML elements that belong in different SysML diagram types. For example, an OPM process, which is defined as an entity that transforms (generates, consumes, or changes the state of) an object, can be mapped to any subset of the following SysML entities:

- Use case (in a use case diagram)
- Action (in an activity diagram)
- State transition trigger (in a state machine diagram).

As OPM and SysML are two distinct and differently designed languages, not all the constructs in one language have equivalent constructs in the other language.

1. The first type of diagram in UML that can be generated from an OPM diagram is the use case diagram which is intended for modeling the usage of a system. The main elements comprising the use case diagram are actors and use cases (the entities) along with the relationships (links) among them. Generation of a use case diagram from OPM is therefore based on environmental objects (the actors) and the processes (the use cases) linked to them. Figure 1 is an example of use case diagram generation of SD0. The figure shows the root OPM diagram (a), the corresponding OPL text (b), and the created use case diagram (c). Figure 2 shows a SD1 level of OPD from the same OPM model (a), and the generated use case diagram (b).
2. The second type of diagram is the block definition diagram (BDD) which defines features of blocks (like properties and operations) and relationships between blocks, such as associations and generalizations. Generating a BDD is based upon the systemic objects of the OPM model and their relationships—mainly structural relations to other model elements.
3. The third type of diagram is activity diagrams which are intended to specify flow. Key components included in the activity diagram are actions and routing flow elements. In our context, a separate Activity Diagram can be generated for each OPM process containing child subprocesses, i.e., a process which is in-zoomed in the OPM model. There are two kinds of user parameters that can be specified via the settings dialog. The first one deals with selection of the OPM processes: One option is to explicitly specify the required OPM processes by selection from a list. The alternative, which is the default option, is to start with the root OPD (SD) and go down the hierarchy. Here we reach the second parameter (that is independent of the first one), which is the required number of OPD levels (k) to go down the hierarchy. In order to give the user control over the level of abstraction, the diagrams are generated up to k levels down the hierarchy. Each level will result in the generation of an additional activity diagram, which is a child activity (subdiagram) contained in the enclosing higher-level activity. The default setting for this option is "all levels down" (i.e., "k = ∞").

== See also ==
- Formal ontology
- Process ontology
- Ontology language
- Upper ontology
