= SD Times =

- Editor: David Rubenstein
- Categories: Computer magazine
- Frequency: Monthly
- First issue: February 2000
- Company: D2 Emerge
- Country: United States
- Based in: Melville, New York
- Language: English
- Website: www.sdtimes.com
- ISSN: 1528-1965
- OCLC: 60638821

Software Development Times, better known as SD Times, is a magazine published by D2 Emerge, in both print and an on-line electronic edition.

== History and profile ==
The first issue appeared in February 2000. The headquarters is in Melville, New York. Since 2003, it has published an annual award list, the "SD Times 100", which honors who the SD Times editors judge to be the top 100 leaders and innovators in the software development industry.

Starting in January 2011, SD Times switched from a bi-monthly to a monthly frequency. In July 2017, BZ Media sold SD Times to D2 Emerge, co-founded by then publisher David Lyman and long-time editor-in-chief David Rubinstein.
