= Computer-aided software engineering =

Domain of software tools

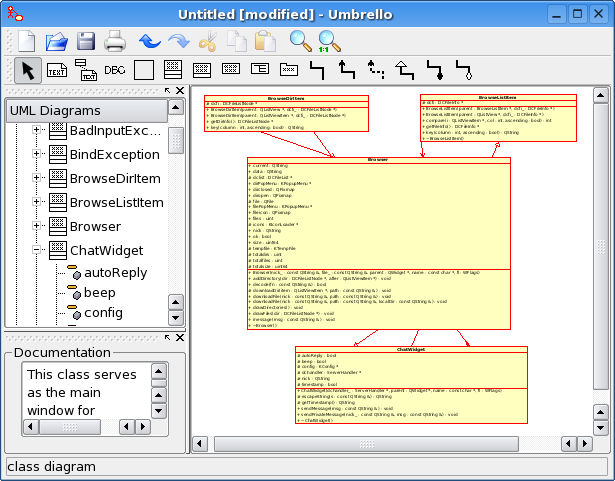
Example of a CASE tool

Computer-aided software engineering (CASE) is a domain of software tools used to design and implement applications. CASE tools are similar to and are partly inspired by computer-aided design (CAD) tools used for designing hardware products. CASE tools are intended to help develop high-quality, defect-free, and maintainable software. CASE software was often associated with methods for the development of information systems together with automated tools that could be used in the software development process.

== History ==
The Information System Design and Optimization System (ISDOS) project, started in 1968 at the University of Michigan, initiated a great deal of interest in the whole concept of using computer systems to help analysts in the very difficult process of analysing requirements and developing systems. Several papers by Daniel Teichroew fired a whole generation of enthusiasts with the potential of automated systems development. His Problem Statement Language / Problem Statement Analyzer (PSL/PSA) tool was a CASE tool although it predated the term.

Another major thread emerged as a logical extension to the data dictionary of a database. By extending the range of metadata held, the attributes of an application could be held within a dictionary and used at runtime. This "active dictionary" became the precursor to the more modern model-driven engineering capability. However, the active dictionary did not provide a graphical representation of any of the metadata. It was the linking of the concept of a dictionary holding analysts' metadata, as derived from the use of an integrated set of techniques, together with the graphical representation of such data that gave rise to the earlier versions of CASE.

The next entrant into the market was Excelerator from Index Technology in Cambridge, Mass. While DesignAid ran on Convergent Technologies and later Burroughs Ngen networked microcomputers, Index launched Excelerator on the IBM PC/AT platform. While, at the time of launch, and for several years, the IBM platform did not support networking or a centralized database as did the Convergent Technologies or Burroughs machines, the allure of IBM was strong, and Excelerator came to prominence. Hot on the heels of Excelerator were a rash of offerings from companies such as Knowledgeware (James Martin, Fran Tarkenton and Don Addington), Texas Instrument's CA Gen and Andersen Consulting's FOUNDATION toolset (DESIGN/1, INSTALL/1, FCP).

CASE tools were at their peak in the early 1990s. According to the PC Magazine of January 1990, over 100 companies were offering nearly 200 different CASE tools. At the time IBM had proposed AD/Cycle, which was an alliance of software vendors centered on IBM's Software repository using IBM DB2 in mainframe and OS/2:

The application development tools can be from several sources: from IBM, from vendors, and from the customers themselves. IBM has entered into relationships with Bachman Information Systems, Index Technology Corporation, and Knowledgeware wherein selected products from these vendors will be marketed through an IBM complementary marketing program to provide offerings that will help to achieve complete life-cycle coverage.

With the decline of the mainframe, AD/Cycle and the Big CASE tools died off, opening the market for the mainstream CASE tools of today. Many of the leaders of the CASE market of the early 1990s ended up being purchased by Computer Associates, including IEW, IEF, ADW, Cayenne, and Learmonth & Burchett Management Systems (LBMS). The other trend that led to the evolution of CASE tools was the rise of object-oriented methods and tools. Most of the various tool vendors added some support for object-oriented methods and tools. In addition new products arose that were designed from the bottom up to support the object-oriented approach. Andersen developed its project Eagle as an alternative to Foundation. Several of the thought leaders in object-oriented development each developed their own methodology and CASE tool set: Jacobson, Rumbaugh, Booch, etc. Eventually, these diverse tool sets and methods were consolidated via standards led by the Object Management Group (OMG). The OMG's Unified Modelling Language (UML) is currently widely accepted as the industry standard for object-oriented modeling.

== CASE software ==
=== Tools ===
CASE tools support specific tasks in the software development life-cycle. They can be divided into the following categories:

1. Business and analysis modeling: Graphical modeling tools. E.g., E/R modeling, object modeling, etc.
2. Development: Design and construction phases of the life-cycle. Debugging environments. E.g., IISE LKO.
3. Verification and validation: Analyze code and specifications for correctness, performance, etc.
4. Configuration management: Control the check-in and check-out of repository objects and files. E.g., SCCS, IISE.
5. Metrics and measurement: Analyze code for complexity, modularity (e.g., no "go to's"), performance, etc.
6. Project management: Manage project plans, task assignments, scheduling.

Another common way to distinguish CASE tools is the distinction between Upper CASE and Lower CASE. Upper CASE Tools support business and analysis modeling. They support traditional diagrammatic languages such as ER diagrams, Data flow diagram, Structure charts, Decision Trees, Decision tables, etc. Lower CASE Tools support development activities, such as physical design, debugging, construction, testing, component integration, maintenance, and reverse engineering. All other activities span the entire life-cycle and apply equally to upper and lower CASE.

=== Workbenches ===
Workbenches integrate two or more CASE tools and support specific software-process activities. Hence they achieve:

- A homogeneous and consistent interface (presentation integration)
- Seamless integration of tools and toolchains (control and data integration)

An example workbench is Microsoft's Visual Basic programming environment. It incorporates several development tools: a GUI builder, a smart code editor, debugger, etc. Most commercial CASE products tended to be such workbenches that seamlessly integrated two or more tools. Workbenches also can be classified in the same manner as tools; as focusing on Analysis, Development, Verification, etc. as well as being focused on the upper case, lower case, or processes such as configuration management that span the complete life-cycle.

=== Environments ===
An environment is a collection of CASE tools or workbenches that attempts to support the complete software process. This contrasts with tools that focus on one specific task or a specific part of the life-cycle. CASE environments are classified by Fuggetta as follows:

1. Toolkits: Loosely coupled collections of tools. These typically build on operating system workbenches such as the Unix Programmer's Workbench or the VMS VAX set. They typically perform integration via piping or some other basic mechanism to share data and pass control. The strength of easy integration is also one of the drawbacks. Simple passing of parameters via technologies such as shell scripting can't provide the kind of sophisticated integration that a common repository database can.
2. Fourth generation: These environments are also known as 4GL standing for fourth generation language environments due to the fact that the early environments were designed around specific languages such as Visual Basic. They were the first environments to provide deep integration of multiple tools. Typically these environments were focused on specific types of applications. For example, user-interface driven applications that did standard atomic transactions to a relational database. Examples are Informix 4GL, and Focus.
3. Language-centered: Environments based on a single often object-oriented language such as the Symbolics Lisp Genera environment or VisualWorks Smalltalk from Parcplace. In these environments all the operating system resources were objects in the object-oriented language. This provides powerful debugging and graphical opportunities but the code developed is mostly limited to the specific language. For this reason, these environments were mostly a niche within CASE. Their use was mostly for prototyping and R&D projects. A common core idea for these environments was the model–view–controller user interface that facilitated keeping multiple presentations of the same design consistent with the underlying model. The MVC architecture was adopted by the other types of CASE environments as well as many of the applications that were built with them.
4. Integrated: These environments are an example of what most IT people tend to think of first when they think of CASE. Environments such as IBM's AD/Cycle, Andersen Consulting's FOUNDATION, the ICL CADES system, and DEC Cohesion. These environments attempt to cover the complete life-cycle from analysis to maintenance and provide an integrated database repository for storing all artifacts of the software process. The integrated software repository was the defining feature for these kinds of tools. They provided multiple different design models as well as support for code in heterogenous languages. One of the main goals for these types of environments was "round trip engineering": being able to make changes at the design level and have those automatically be reflected in the code and vice versa. These environments were also typically associated with a particular methodology for software development. For example, the FOUNDATION CASE suite from Andersen was closely tied to the Andersen Method/1 methodology.
5. Process-centered: This is the most ambitious type of integration. These environments attempt to not just formally specify the analysis and design objects of the software process but the actual process itself and to use that formal process to control and guide software projects. Examples are East, Enterprise II, Process Wise, Process Weaver, and Arcadia. These environments were by definition tied to some methodology since the software process itself is part of the environment and can control many aspects of tool invocation.

In practice, the distinction between workbenches and environments was flexible. Visual Basic for example was a programming workbench but was also considered a 4GL environment by many. The features that distinguished workbenches from environments were deep integration via a shared repository or common language and some kind of methodology (integrated and process-centered environments) or domain (4GL) specificity.

== Major CASE risk factors ==
Some of the most significant risk factors for organizations adopting CASE technology include:

- Inadequate standardization: Organizations usually have to tailor and adopt methodologies and tools to their specific requirements. Doing so may require significant effort to integrate both divergent technologies as well as divergent methods. For example, before the adoption of the UML standard the diagram conventions and methods for designing object-oriented models were vastly different among followers of Jacobson, Booch, and Rumbaugh.
- Unrealistic expectations: The proponents of CASE technology—especially vendors marketing expensive tool sets—often hype expectations that the new approach will be a silver bullet that solves all problems. In reality no such technology can do that and if organizations approach CASE with unrealistic expectations they will inevitably be disappointed.
- Inadequate training: As with any new technology, CASE requires time to train people in how to use the tools and to get up to speed with them. CASE projects can fail if practitioners are not given adequate time for training or if the first project attempted with the new technology is itself highly mission critical and fraught with risk.
- Inadequate process control: CASE provides significant new capabilities to utilize new types of tools in innovative ways. Without the proper process guidance and controls these new capabilities can cause significant new problems as well.

== See also ==
- Data modeling
- Domain-specific modeling
- Method engineering
- Model-driven architecture
- Modeling language
- Rapid application development
- Automatic programming
- Test automation
- Build automation
- Integrated Development Environment
- End-user development
- Visual programming language
