= RUP hump =

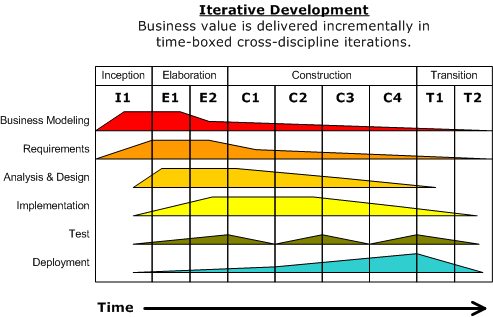
RUP phases and disciplines.

A RUP ‘hump’ is a plot of effort spent over time during a particular Rational Unified Process (RUP) discipline. The RUP hump chart consists of a collection of humps for all RUP disciplines. This diagram was created in 1993 during a workshop on architecture and process and was inspired by work by Grady Booch and Boehm. It has been part of the Rational Objectory Process after reviews by Dyrhage and Bylund and moved on to play a more important role in the RUP in 1998 when it served as the initial page for using the digital version of the process. Its final form was published by Philippe Kruchten in 1998. An older version as later used by Jacobson, Booch and Rumbaugh and an altered version was used by Royce.

Over the years, this diagram has become increasingly connected with RUP, so that sometimes it is regarded as a logo for the process. The chart has then since been spread widely over the Internet. A known misconception about the hump chart is, that it is based on empirical assessment of actual projects rather than on Kruchten's educated guess.

...I always insisted that these humps were just illustrative, as well as the number and duration of iterations shown on the horizontal axis, but many people wanted to read much more meaning in that diagram than I intended. For example, a gentleman from Korea once wrote me to ask for a large original diagram to measure the heights, and ‘integrate' the area under the humps, to help him do project estimation...

Recently Werner Heijstek and Michel R.V. Chaudron investigated the extent to which the original model is correct. Their findings include data from industrial software engineering projects.
