= Shlaer–Mellor method =

The Shlaer–Mellor method, also known as object-oriented systems analysis (OOSA) or object-oriented analysis (OOA) is an object-oriented software development methodology introduced by Sally Shlaer and Stephen Mellor in 1988. The method makes the documented analysis so precise that it is possible to implement the analysis model directly by translation to the target architecture, rather than by elaborating model changes through a series of more platform-specific models. In the new millennium the Shlaer–Mellor method has migrated to the UML notation, becoming Executable UML.

== Overview ==
History of object-oriented methods and notations since the late 1980s

The Shlaer–Mellor method is one of a number of software development methodologies which arrived in the late 1980s. Most familiar were object-oriented analysis and design (OOAD) by Grady Booch, object modeling technique (OMT) by James Rumbaugh, object-oriented software engineering by Ivar Jacobson and object-oriented analysis (OOA) by Shlaer and Mellor. These methods had adopted a new object-oriented paradigm to overcome the established weaknesses in the existing structured analysis and structured design (SASD) methods of the 1960s and 1970s. Of these well-known problems, Shlaer and Mellor chose to address:

- The complexity of designs generated through the use of structured analysis and structured design (SASD) methods.
- The problem of maintaining analysis and design documentation over time.

Before publication of their second book in 1991 Shlaer and Mellor had stopped naming their method "Object-Oriented Systems Analysis" in favor of just "Object-Oriented Analysis". The method started focusing on the concept of Recursive Design (RD), which enabled the automated translation aspect of the method.

What makes Shlaer–Mellor unique among the object-oriented methods is:

- the degree to which object-oriented semantic decomposition is taken,
- the precision of the Shlaer–Mellor Notation used to express the analysis, and
- the defined behavior of that analysis model at run-time.

The general solution taken by the object-oriented analysis and design methods to these particular problems with structured analysis and design, was to switch from functional decomposition to semantic decomposition. For example, one can describe the control of a passenger train as:

load passengers, close doors, start train, stop train, open doors, unload passengers.

Then a design becomes focused on the behavior of doors, brakes, and passengers, and how those objects (doors, brakes, etc.) are related and behave within the passenger train domain. Other objects, that provide services used by the passenger train domain, are modeled in other domains connected to the passenger train domain.

== Shlaer–Mellor method topics ==
=== Translation v. elaboration ===
The goal of the Shlaer–Mellor method is to make the documented analysis so precise that it is possible to implement the analysis model directly by translation rather than by elaboration. In Shlaer–Mellor terminology this is called recursive design. In current (2011) terminology, we would say the Shlaer–Mellor method uses a form of model-driven architecture (MDA) normally associated with the Unified Modeling Language (UML).

By taking this translative approach, the implementation is always generated (either manually, or more typically, automatically) directly from the analysis. This is not to say that there is no design in Shlaer–Mellor, rather that there is considered to be a virtual machine that can execute any Shlaer–Mellor analysis model for any particular hardware/software platform combination.

This is similar in concept to the virtual machines at the heart of the Java programming language and the Ada programming language, but existing at analysis level rather than at programming level. Once designed and implemented, such a virtual machine is re-usable across a range of applications. Shlaer–Mellor virtual machines are available commercially from a number of tool vendors, notably Abstract Solutions, Mentor Graphics and Pathfinder Solutions.

=== Semantic decomposition ===
Shlaer–Mellor proposes a semantic decomposition in multiple (problem) domains.

- The split between analysis and design models: The analysis domain expresses precisely what the system must do, the design domain is a model of how the Shlaer–Mellor virtual machine operates for a particular hardware and software platform. These models are disjoint, the only connection being the notation used to express the models.
- Decomposition within the analysis domain where system requirements are modelled, and grouped, around specific, disjoint, subject matters. To return to the earlier passenger train example, individual semantic models may be created based on door actuators, motor controls, and braking systems. Each grouping is considered, and modelled, independently. The only defined relationship between the groupings are dependencies e.g. a passenger train application may depend on both door actuation and motor control. Braking systems may depend upon motor control.

Domain models of door actuators, motor controls, and braking systems would typically be considered as generic re-usable service domains whereas the passenger train controller domain is likely to be a very product-specific application domain.

A particular system is composed of domains and the defined bridges between the domains. A bridge is described in the terms of the assumptions held by the domain acting as a client bridged to a domain acting as a server.

=== Precise action language ===
One of the requirements for automated code generation is to precisely model the actions within the finite-state machines used to express dynamic behaviour of Shlaer–Mellor objects.

Shlaer–Mellor is unique amongst object-oriented analysis methods in expressing such sequential behavior graphically as Action Data Flow Diagrams (ADFDs). In practice the tools that supported Shlaer–Mellor, provided a precise action language. The action languages superseded the ADFD approach, so all actions are written in textual form.

=== Test and simulation ===
The translative approach of the Shlaer–Mellor method lends itself to automated test and simulation environments (by switching the target platform during code generation), and this may partly explain the popularity of Shlaer–Mellor and other MDA-based methods when developing embedded systems, where testing on target systems e.g. mobile phones or engine management systems, is particularly difficult.

What makes such testing useful and productive is the concept of the Shlaer–Mellor virtual machine. As with most OOA/OOD methods, Shlaer–Mellor is an event-driven, message-passing environment. Onto this generic view, the Shlaer–Mellor virtual machine mandates a prioritised event mechanism built around State Models, which allows for concurrent execution of actions in different state machines.

Since any implementation of Shlaer–Mellor requires this model to be fully supported, testing under simulation can be a very close model of testing on target platform. Whilst functionality heavily dependent upon timing constraints may be difficult to test, the majority of system behaviour is highly predictable due to the prioritized execution model.

== Criticisms ==
There has never been a universally agreed textual language to express actions within the Shlaer–Mellor community. Tool vendors have defined their own copyrighted and controlled action languages.

Graham (1994) described Shlaer–Mellor method as early example of object-oriented analysis, that could not really be regarded as object-oriented. According to Graham the method lacks "notion of inheritance. As described in their book it was little more than an object-based extension of data modelling." In line with comment Capretz (1996) argues that the Shlaer–Mellor method "fails to account for the vast majority of object-oriented ideas and an ordinary graphical notation is prescribed", which is primarily taken "from entity–relationship diagrams and data flow diagrams found in other structured methods".

== See also ==
- Embedded system
- Executable UML
- Finite-state machine (FSM)
- Functional decomposition
- I-OOA
- Massive parallelism
- Model-driven architecture (MDA)
- Structured analysis
- Unified Modeling Language (UML)

== Bibliography ==
- Stephen Mellor (2002) Make Models Be Assets, Communications of the ACM Volume 45, 11:76-87 (November 2002), 2002
- Rodney C. Montrose (2001) Object-Oriented Development Using The Shlaer–Mellor Method. Project Technology, Inc.
- Sally Shlaer, Stephen Mellor (1988) Object-Oriented Systems Analysis: Modeling the World in Data, Yourdon Press. ISBN 0-13-629023-X
- Sally Shlaer, Stephen Mellor (1991) Object Lifecycles: Modeling the World in States, Yourdon Press. ISBN 0-13-629940-7
- Leon Starr (1996) How to Build Shlaer–Mellor Object Models. Prentice Hall. ISBN 0-13-207663-2
