= Essential unified process =

The essential unified process for software development, or EssUP, was invented by Ivar Jacobson as an improvement on the rational unified process. It identifies practices, such as use cases, iterative development, architecture driven development, team practices and process practices, which are borrowed from RUP, CMMI and agile development. The idea is that you can pick those practices that are applicable to your situation and combine them into your own process. This is considered an improvement with respect to RUP, because with RUP the practices are all intertwined and cannot be taken in isolation.

EssUP is supported by a set of playing cards, each card describing a practice. This is because Ivar Jacobson believes that people buy his books but few read them.

It is announced that EssUP will be supported both by the IBM Rational toolset, Eclipse and Microsoft's Visual Studio.
