= Object-oriented analysis =

Object-oriented analysis, an alternate name for the

- Shlaer–Mellor method or Object-Oriented Analysis, an object-oriented software development methodology introduced by Sally Shlaer and Stephen Mellor
- Object-oriented analysis and design, a popular technical approach for analyzing and designing software systems by applying the object-oriented paradigm
