= Booch =

Booch may refer to:

- Grady Booch (born 1955), software engineer
- Booch method, a method for object-oriented software development developed by Grady Booch
- Kombucha, a fermented tea drink
