= UPEDU =

The UPEDU or Unified Process for Education is a software development process specialized for education, developed by Pierre-N. Robillard (École Polytechnique de Montréal), Philippe Kruchten (Rational Software) and Patrick d'Astous (École Polytechnique de Montréal).

UPEDU is a customization of the IBM Rational Unified Process (or RUP) and therefore inherits the most prominent properties of RUP, such as:

- It is iterative and an implementation of the spiral model
- The process is divided in time into four phases; the inception, elaboration, construction and transition phases, each of which consists of one or more milestones. For each phase, the set of artifacts (work products) and the work flow are defined by the process.
- The activities are categorized into disciplines, to clarify the required expertise and categorize the activities.

To help implementing the UPEDU in educational purposes, the authors have put a website online that provides most of the information that students need to use the process in their project.

== Disciplines ==
The disciplines in UPEDU in comparison to RUP are more aimed towards getting familiar with the unifying process and teaching the effect of using and adapting the process. Therefore, the RUP model has been simplified on some points, and the Nusiness modeling discipline, the Deployment discipline and the Environment discipline have been left out of the process.

== Known uses ==
- The Dutch University of Groningen and the Swedish Linnaeus University offer students a collaborative course called ISEP (International Software Engineering Project) in which UPEDU is heavily used.
- The École Polytechnique de Montréal, alma mater of Robillard, features a course focused on software project management using UPEDU as a teaching tool.
