= Mike Devlin (entrepreneur) =

American entrepreneur

Mike Devlin is an US-based entrepreneur who co-founded Rational Software Corporation, a software development company based in Lexington, Massachusetts.

Devlin graduated from the United States Air Force Academy 1977 after studying electrical engineering and computer science. He completed a M.S. in computer science at Stanford University the following year.

As CEO of Rational, Devlin oversaw the acquisition of several companies, including Objectory AB (1995), and Catapulse (2001), a start-up which was funded by Rational, in conjunction with Benchmark Capital.

In 2003, Rational Software was acquired by IBM for 2.1 billion U.S. dollars, a move that saw Devlin become general manager with IBM. He retired from the company two years later.
