= Objectory AB =

Swedish software company

Objectory Systems
- Industry: Software Engineering
- Founded: 1987; 39 years ago
- Founder: Ivar Jacobson
- Defunct: 1991
- Fate: Acquired by Rational Software Corporation
- Headquarters: Sweden
- Products: Objectory programming language

Objectory Systems was a software company based in Sweden that was instrumental in the development of Object-oriented program design. Founded in 1987 by Ivar Jacobson, the company developed Objectory, an object-oriented development method which was an extension of what is known as the Ericsson Approach, a modeling language developed at Ericsson. This language featured state charts with activity diagrams, as well as sequence diagrams.

In 1991, Ericsson purchased a substantial amount of the stake in Objectory Systems. As a result, Objectory Systems became known as Objectory AB — a subsidiary of Ericsson. In 1995, Rational Software Corporation acquired the subsidiary.

== See also ==
- Rational Software
- Object-oriented software engineering
