= OOSA =

OOSA can relate to:

- United Nations Office for Outer Space Affairs
- OOSA, the ICAO code for Salalah Airport
- Object Oriented Structured Analysis
