= Clive Boughton =

Australian academic

- Born: 4 August 1956 (age 70); Canberra, Australian Capital Territory, Australia
- Occupation: Computer science professor
- Website: cs.anu.edu

Clive Boughton (born 4 August 1956) is an Australian computer science professor residing in Canberra, in the Australian Capital Territory. He is a senior lecturer in the Faculty of Engineering and Information Technology at the Australian National University. He is the managing director of Software Improvements Pty Ltd.

== Professional career ==
Before completing his BSc Boughton undertook both research (at ARRB Group Ltd.) and industrial practice (at USL as Lab Manager) concerning the physical properties of soils. He published a paper on the soil compacting properties of rollers for road-making. Boughton obtained his BSc (applied physics) from RMIT University in Melbourne in 1976.

After completing his BSc he became a professional officer at the department of physics at Monash University in Melbourne where did research into the specific heat of superconducting alloys. He published a research paper on the Fe(3-x)Mn(x)Si category of superconducting compounds/alloys as a result of his work at Monash.

Boughton began his PhD at Australian National University in 1981 and began studying gaseous dynamics. He obtained his PhD in molecular physics in 1988.

== Further afield ==
Boughton left the university environment to take a senior software engineering position at C3 in 1984. He worked at several other companies, including his own, before accepting a Visiting Fellow position in the Department of Computer Science at Australian National University in 1995, eventually becoming a full-time member of the department in 2000.

Boughton was a contributor to the establishment of the BS Eng degree program within Department of Computer Science/Faculty of Engineering and Information Technology.

He was involved in eVACS (Electronic voting and counting), a computer system that provides for electronic voting and electronic counting for ACT Legislative Assembly elections. It provides for counting according to the Hare-Clark electoral system rules set out in the Electoral Act 1992. He was involved in requirements identification and design.

== See also ==
Executable UML
