= Ivar Jacobson =

Swedish computer scientist and software engineer

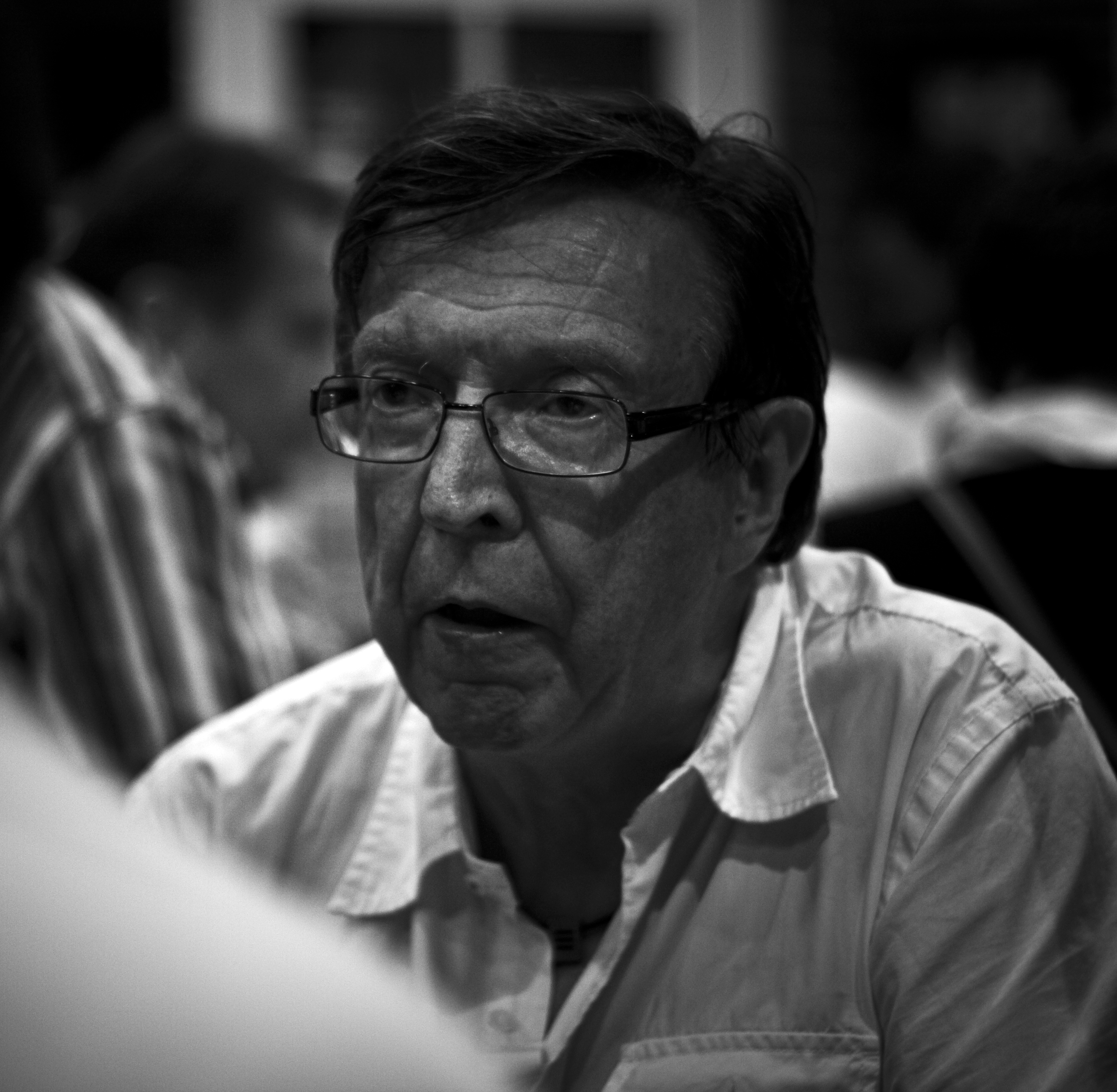
- Born: Ivar Hjalmar Jacobson; September 2, 1939 (age 86); Ystad, Sweden
- Education: Chalmers Institute of Technology, Gothenburg; Royal Institute of Technology, Stockholm
- Known for: Components and component architecture; use-cases and use-case driven development; SDL; major contributions to UML; Objectory; RUP; aspect-oriented software development; SEMAT; Essence
- Scientific career
- Fields: Electrical engineering; computer science; software engineering
- Workplaces: Ericsson; Objective Systems; Rational Software; IBM; Ivar Jacobson International
- Website: www.ivarjacobson.com

Ivar Hjalmar Jacobson (Swedish pronunciation: [ˈǐːvar ˈjɑ̂ːkɔbˌsɔn]; born September 2, 1939) is a Swedish computer scientist and software engineer, known as a major contributor to UML, Objectory, Rational Unified Process (RUP), aspect-oriented software development, and Essence.

== Biography ==
Ivar Jacobson was born in Ystad, on September 2, 1939. He received his Master of Electrical Engineering degree at Chalmers Institute of Technology in Gothenburg in 1962. After his work at Ericsson, he formalized the language and method he had been working on in his PhD at the Royal Institute of Technology in Stockholm in 1985 on the thesis "Language Constructs for Large Real Time Systems".

After his master's degree, Jacobson joined Ericsson and worked in R&D on computerized switching systems AKE and AXE including PLEX. In April 1987, he started Objective Systems. A majority stake of the company was acquired by Ericsson in 1991, and the company was renamed Objectory AB. Jacobson developed the software method Object-Oriented Software Engineering (OOSE) published 1992, which was a simplified version of the commercial software process Objectory (short for Object Factory).

In October 1995, Ericsson divested Objectory to Rational Software, and Jacobson started working with Grady Booch and James Rumbaugh. When IBM bought Rational in 2003, Jacobson decided to leave. He formed Ivar Jacobson International (IJI) in mid-2004, which operates with offices in the UK and Sweden.

IJI has developed several products providing use cases for Essence, the latest being Essence WorkBench.

In 2000, with Agneta Jacobson, he founded Jaczone AB which developed a tool, Waypointer, to support RUP using intelligent agent techniques. Waypointer received a JOLT award in 2004.

Ivar Jacobson was awarded the Gustaf Dalén medal from Chalmers University in 2003, and received an honorary doctorate at San Martin de Porres University, Peru, in 2009.

== Work ==
=== Summary ===
Dr. Ivar Jacobson's contributions span over 50 years, starting from components and architecture in 1967 and still ongoing today with Essence, which is described as "a common ground for engineering". He also created Use Cases, and co-created UML and the Rational Unified Process. His software products include Objectory and the intelligent agent tool Waypointer.

=== Ericsson ===
In 1967 at Ericsson, Jacobson proposed software components in the new generation of software controlled telephone switches Ericsson was developing. In doing this he also invented sequence diagrams, and developed collaboration diagrams. He also used state transition diagrams to describe the message flows between components.

Jacobson saw a need for blueprints for software development. He was one of the original developers of the Specification and Design Language (SDL). In 1976, SDL became a standard in the telecoms industry.

In 1986, he also invented use cases as a way to specify functional software requirements.

=== Rational Software ===
At Rational, Jacobson and his colleagues, Grady Booch and James Rumbaugh, became the original developers of UML, and his Objectory Process evolved to become the Rational Unified Process under the leadership of Philippe Kruchten.

=== Essential Unified Process ===
In November 2005, Jacobson announced the Essential Unified Process or "EssUP" for short. EssUP was a new "Practice"-centric software development process derived from established software development practices. It integrated practices sourced from three different process camps: the unified process camp, the agile software development camp, and the process improvement (primarily the Capability Maturity Model Integration (CMMI)) camp. Each one of them contributed different capabilities: structure, agility, and process improvement.

Ivar has described EssUP as a "super light and agile" RUP. IJI have integrated EssUP into Microsoft Visual Studio Team System and Eclipse.

=== EssWork ===
Standing on the experience of EssUP Ivar and his team, in particular Ian Spence and Pan Wei Ng, developed EssWork starting in 2006. EssWork is a framework for working with methods. It is based on a kernel of universal elements always prevalent in software development endeavors. On top of the kernel some fifteen practices were defined. A team can create their own method by composing practices.

=== SEMAT and Essence ===
In November 2009, Jacobson, Bertrand Meyer, and Richard Soley ("the Troika") started an initiative called SEMAT (Software Engineering Method and Theory) to seek to develop a rigorous, theoretically basis for software engineering practice, and to promote its wide adoption by industry and academia. SEMAT has been inspired by the work at IJI, but with a fresh new start. Essence, an OMG standard since November 2014, is the end result of SEMAT. Methods are created as compositions of reusable practices.

== Publications ==
Jacobson has published numerous books and articles. A selection:

- 1992. Object-Oriented Software Engineering: A Use Case Driven Approach (ACM Press) With Magnus Christerson, Patrik Jonsson & Gunnar Overgaard. Addison-Wesley, 1992, ISBN 0-201-54435-0
- 1994. The Object Advantage: Business Process Reengineering With Object Technology (ACM Press). With M. Ericsson & A. Jacobson. Addison-Wesley, ISBN 0-201-42289-1
- 1997. Software Reuse: Architecture, Process, and Organization for Business Success (ACM Press). With Martin Griss & Patrik Jonsson. Addison-Wesley, 1997, ISBN 0-201-92476-5
- 1998. The Unified Modeling Language Reference Manual. With Grady Booch & James Rumbaugh. Addison-Wesley Professional, 2004, ISBN 0-321-24562-8
- 1998. The Unified Modeling Language User Guide. With Grady Booch & James Rumbaugh. Addison-Wesley Professional, 2005, ISBN 0-321-26797-4
- 1999. The Unified Software Development Process. With Grady Booch & James Rumbaugh. Addison-Wesley Professional, 1999, ISBN 0-201-57169-2
- 2000. The Road to the Unified Software Development Process. With Stefan Bylund. Cambridge University Press, 1999, ISBN 978-0415817615
- 2004. Aspect-Oriented Software Development With Use Cases (Addison-Wesley Object Technology Series). With Pan-Wei Ng. Addison-Wesley, ISBN 0-321-26888-1
- 2013. The Essence of Software Engineering – Applying the SEMAT Kernel. With Pan-Wei Ng, Paul Mc Mahon, Ian Spence, and Svante Lidman. Addison-Wesley, 2013, ISBNISBN 978-0321885951
- 2015. Software Engineering in the Systems Context. With Bud Lawson. College Publications, 2015, ISBN 978-1848901766
- 2019. The Essentials of Modern Software Engineering – Free the Practices from the Method prisons. With Harold "Bud" Lawson, Pan-Wei Ng, Paul Mc Mahon, and Michael Goedicke. ACM Books & Morgan & Claypool publishers, 2019, ISBN 978-1-947487-24-6
