= Rational Performance Tester =

Automated Testing Software

- Developer: Rational Software
- Stable release: 10.0.2 / December 2019
- Operating system: Microsoft Windows Linux AIX
- Type: test automation tools
- License: Proprietary
- Website: "RPT Knowledge Centre".

Rational Performance Tester is a tool for automated performance testing of web- and server-based applications from the Rational Software division of IBM. It allows users to create tests that mimic user transactions between an application client and server. During test execution, these transactions are replicated in parallel to simulate a large transaction load on the server. Server response time measurements are collected to identify the presence and cause of any potential application bottlenecks. It is primarily used by Software Quality Assurance teams to perform automated software performance testing.
