= Stephen J. Mellor =

British computer scientist (born 1952)

- Born: 1952 (age 73–74)
- Education: University of Essex
- Known for: Ward–Mellor method for real-time computing, Shlaer–Mellor method, Executable UML, Agile Manifesto
- Scientific career
- Fields: Computer science

Stephen J. Mellor (born 1952) is an American computer scientist, developer of the Ward–Mellor method for real-time computing, the Shlaer–Mellor method, and Executable UML, and signatory to the Agile Manifesto.

== Biography ==
Mellor received a BA in computer science from the University of Essex in 1974, and started working at CERN in Geneva, Switzerland as a programmer in BCPL. In 1977 he became software engineer at the Lawrence Berkeley Laboratory, and in 1982 consultant at Yourdon, Inc.

At Yourdon in cooperation with Paul Ward they developed the Ward–Mellor method, and published the book-series Structured Development for Real Time Systems in 1985.

Together with Sally Shlaer he founded Project Technology in 1985. That company was acquired by Mentor Graphics in 2004. Mellor stayed as chief scientist of the Embedded Systems Division at Mentor Graphics for another two years, and is self-employed since 2006.

Since 1998 Mellor has contributed to the Object Management Group, chairing the consortium that added executable actions to the UML, and the specification of model-driven architecture (MDA). He is also chairing the advisory board of the IEEE Software magazine. Since 2013, Mellor has served as CTO for the Industrial Internet Consortium.

== Publications ==
- 1985. Structured Development for Real-Time Systems: Essential Modeling Techniques. With Paul T. Ward. Prentice Hall.
- 1986. Structured Development for Real-Time Systems: Implementation Modeling Techniques (Structured Development for Real-Time Systems Vol. 1). With Paul T. Ward. Prentice Hall.
- 1988. Object Oriented Systems Analysis: Modeling the World in Data. With Sally Shlaer. Prentice Hall.
- 1992. Object Life Cycles: Modeling the World In States. With Sally Shlaer. Prentice Hall.
- 2002. Executable UML: A Foundation for Model Driven Architecture. With Marc J. Balcer. Addison-Wesley.
- 2004. MDA Distilled. With Kendall Scott, Axel Uhl, Dirk Weise. Addison-Wesley.

Articles, a selection:

- 1989. "An object-oriented approach to domain analysis" with S. Shlaer. In: ACM SIGSOFT Software Engineering Notes. Vol 14–5, July 1989. pp. 66–77.
- 1997. "Why explore object methods, patterns, and architectures?" with Ralph Johnson. In: IEEE Software. Vol. 14, no. 1, pp. 27–29.
- 1999. "Softwareplatform-independent, precise action specifications for UML". With S. Tockey, R. Arthaud, P. LeBlanc - The Unified Modeling ..., 1999.
- 2002. "Make models be assets". In: Commun. ACM Vol 45–11. pp. 76–78.
- 2003. "A framework for aspect-oriented modeling". Paper from 4th (AOSD) Modeling With (UML) Workshop, October 2003.
- 2004. "Agile MDA" White paper 2004.

== See also ==
- Data flow
- State transition
