= Rational R1000 =

Type of computer released in 1985

Rational Software R1000 Development System
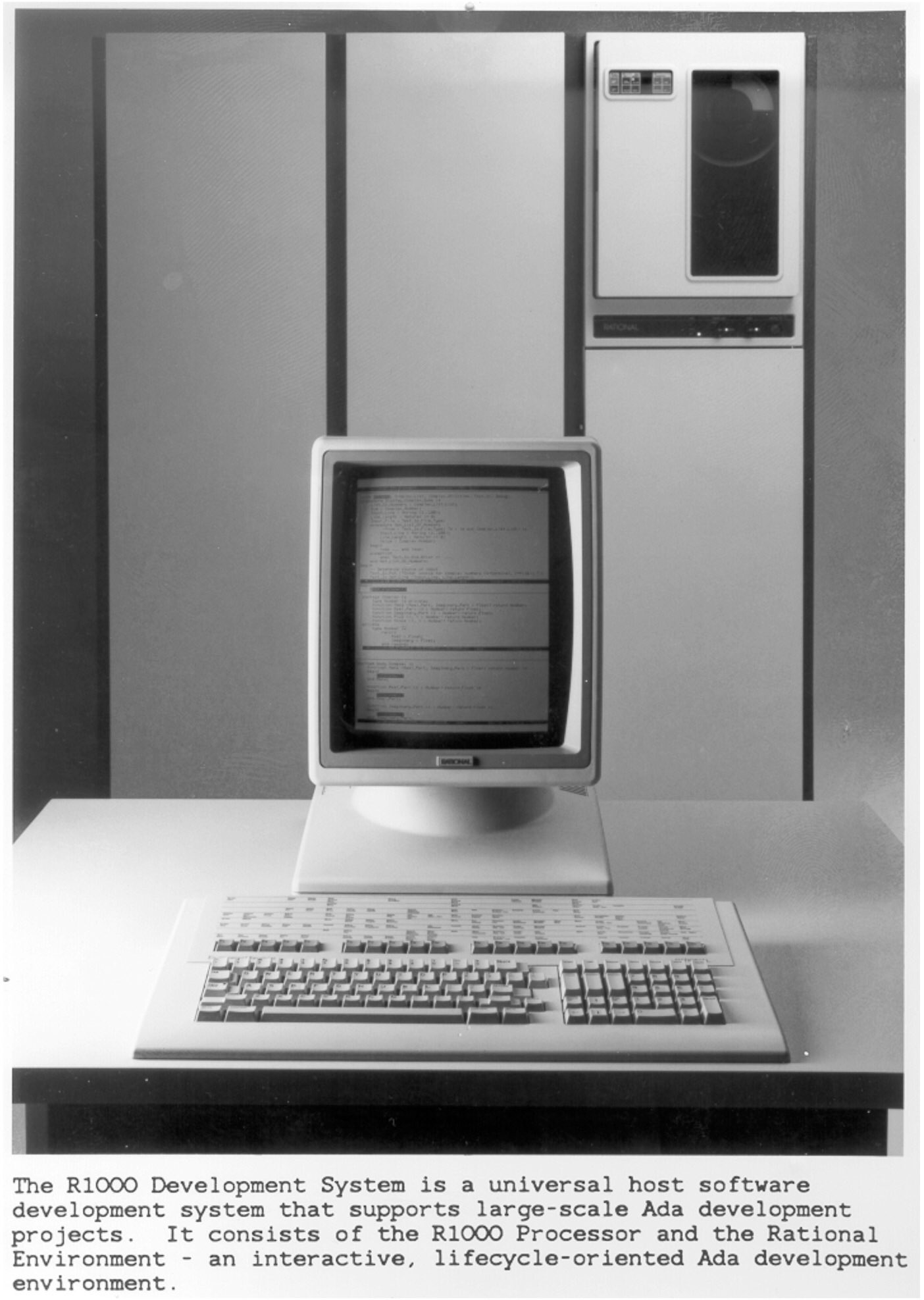
- Ada programming developing system
- Date invented: 1985

The R1000 was a workstation released in 1985 by Rational Software for the design, documentation, implementation, and maintenance of large software systems written using the Ada programming language. The R1000 featured an extensive tool set, including:

- an Ada-83-compatible program design language
- an integrated development environment that doubled as an operating system shell
- automatic generation of design documentation
- source-language debugging
- interactive design-rule checking and semantic analysis
- incremental compilation
- configuration management and version control.

Optimizing code generators and cross-debuggers provided support for several popular application architectures.

As a successor to the R1000, Rational produced a new IDE called Rational Apex. Rational Apex took many of the features that the R1000 introduced and extended (ported) them onto commonly available workstations from Sun Microsystems and IBM.

Several R1000 units exist in museums and private collections, but, because of the classified nature of much Ada programming, these units had been wiped; efforts have been made to boot one of these systems, with little or no luck as of 2013. On 28 October 2019 the DataMuseum.dk successfully got one unit back into running condition.
