= Macroscope (methodology suite) =

- Developer(s): Fujitsu
- Initial release: 1990; 35 years ago
- Stable release: Macroscope 5.0 / March 26, 2012; 13 years ago
- Operating system: Microsoft Windows
- Available in: English and French
- Type: Business Process
- License: Proprietary software
- Website: macroscope.ca.fujitsu.com

Macroscope is an integrated set of methods aimed at enterprise IT activities. Macroscope was developed and is maintained by Fujitsu in Canada. It is primarily used as their core body of knowledge to support the consulting services that they provide to their clients and is also licensed as a commercial product to a number of their clients

== History ==
=== 1984-1985: "DMR" Information System Development Guides ===
The first publication of methods that are at the source of Macroscope were two "Information System Development Guides": Part 1 Managing the Project and Part 2 Developing the System. The same books were published in French in 1984. These two methods were known as the "DMR" methods and were later attributed version number 1.0.

The two methods were based on fundamentals or principles that established the general approach. The methods were described in terms of processes, techniques and deliverables. The main approach for system design was by integrating the French Merise data and the American Gane and Sarson process modelling methods.

=== 1987-1990: Information System Delivery Series ===
Publication of a set of five books collectively called "Information System Delivery Series" by DMR Group Inc. This publication was also issued in French under the title: "Collection Mise en oeuvre de systèmes d'information". The collection contained the following books:

- Project Management Guide, ISBN 2-9801017-5-3
- System Development Guide, ISBN 2-9801017-7-X
- System Owner's Guide, ISBN 2-920921-01-0
- Prototyping Guide, ISBN 2-9801017-9-6
- Sample Set of Phase Reports. ISBN 2-920921-03-7

The 1987 edition was later attributed version number 2.0. The 1990 edition of this collection was re-labeled "DMR Productivity Plus", which was quickly nicknamed to "P+" by users. This edition is later attributed version number 2.1.

=== 1990-1996: DMR Macroscope ===
Research and Development project labelled "Le Macroscope Informatique", leads to the product initially called "DMR Macroscope" and re-branded in 2002 to "Macroscope". This program was initiated by DMR Group Inc., along with the Province of Quebec (Canada), industrial partners, research centers partners, and user groups that contributed financially and logistically. The initial objective of this program was to "develop a set of integrated products, that is, methods, software tools, training program in order to improve the development and usage of information technology". In a 1996 Research Note, Gartner writes:

Taken together, this is one of the most extensive sets of methods and tools produced by any vendor. DMR's purpose is focused on service delivery, but the methods are clearly designed for use by clients.

This R&D effort was divided into four knowledge domains, initially known as Productivity Plus (P+), Strategy Plus (S+) Benefits Plus (B+) and Architecture Plus (A+).

=== 1994-1995: "P+OnLine" method ===
A first commercial product under the "DMR Macroscope" umbrella, called "P+ OnLine" is released in 1994 and is the first release to display a version number, that is 2.2. Then the project gradually releases the following product components under new commercial names:

- DMR ProductivityCentre (renaming of ProductivityPlus)
- DMR ArchitectureLab (renaming of Architecture Plus)
- DMR ResultStation (renaming of Benefits Plus)
- DMR StrategyForum (renaming of Strategy Plus)

=== 1996-1998: DMR Macroscope 3.0 - 3.1 ===
Released in 1996, DMR Macroscope 3.0 was the first publication of the methodology in the HTML format, with mitigated success. This version was replaced in 1998 with version 3.1.

=== 2001: DMR Macroscope 3.5 ===
Release of version 3.5. The domain names lose their "DMR" prefixes, and ManagementSuite is added to the DMR Macroscope product.

=== 2002-2011: Macroscope 4.0 - 4.9 ===
Release of 4.0 in 2002. Re branding of the company to Fujitsu Consulting and the product suite loses its "DMR" prefix and is simply branded as "Macroscope". Then successive versions 4.5 to 4.9, and interim updates are released at a pace of approximately one per year.

=== 2012: Macroscope 5.0 ===
Release of 5.0 in 2012. The domain names are changed to a simpler terminology. The product is also offered "as a service" or hosted version for specific clients.

=== 2014: Macroscope 5.2 ===
The enterprise architecture approach is substantively revised.

== Knowledge organization ==
The Macroscope methodology suite is organised into five process domains, The domains are: Architecture (previously known as ArchitectureLab) for enterprise architecture, Project (previously known as ManagementSuite) for project management, Solution (previously known as ProductivityCentre) for system development and maintenance, Benefits (previously known as ResultStation) for benefits realisation program management and portfolio management, and Vision (previously known as StrategyForum) for enterprise strategy.

All domains of Macroscope are structured in a similar fashion using concepts described in the Software Process Engineering Metamodel (SPEM) of the Object Management Group (OMG). Fujitsu was one of the many contributors to SPEM and sections of Macroscope are used to depict some elements of SPEM.

A domain of Macroscope typically presents the following sections. A process, usually presented as a workflow, describes the phases, steps and activities, under the responsibility of which role, and what deliverables are resulting from the process. A deliverable, presented with a description, a template and, generally, one or more examples, is a work product resulting from a process. A technique is a detailed method of accomplishing something, and is used to produce the content of one or more deliverables.

Some domains of Macroscope contain many processes. For example, the domain called Project, contains only one process, called Project Management, while the Benefits domain contains a Program Management process and a Portfolio Management process.

Each Macroscope domain is also based on a set of fundamental principles, which help understanding, adapting and using the process.

== Methodology domains ==
=== Vision ===
Before version 5.0, this was known as StrategyForum, formed of two words: Strategy, the main subject of interest, and Forum, referring to a group of stakeholders discussing about the evolution or the future of something.

The intent of Vision is to provide a methodology to capture, structure, document and confirm an organisation's business strategy, and understand the organisation's strategy process.

=== Architecture ===
Before version 5.0, this was known as ArchitectureLab, formed of two words: Architecture, the main subject of interest referring to Enterprise Architecture, and Lab, referring to the word Laboratory, where one can simulate the reality through a model representing such reality. In this context, ArchitectureLab initially came with a modeling and simulation tool that allowed one to create a model of business processes and simulate the behaviour of such process.

The intent of Architecture is to provide a method for delivering the capabilities required to support the organization's strategy.

=== Solution ===
Before version 5.0, this was known as ProductivityCentre. This domain name was not following exactly the same naming pattern as the other domains. This is largely due to the longer history of this methodology used to be called Productivity Plus, often referred to as P+ by users. To preserve a strong connection the word Productivity was kept and the word "Centre" was added to refer to "where things get delivered".

The intent of Solution is to provide organizations with the appropriate information system solutions and help them maintain and operate these systems to continuously support their evolving business needs.

=== Benefits ===
Before version 5.0, this was known as ResultStation, formed of two words: Results (the final "s" combined with the starting "s" of the second word), which refers to the outcomes resulting from a series of change initiatives into an organization. The second word, Station, refers to a control station where one could plan, observe, pull levers and steer where the change initiatives are going.

The intent of Benefits is to help organizations formulate and manage programs in order to obtain maximum business value from their investments in new technologies and IT-enabled business improvement initiatives.

=== Project ===
Before version 5.0, this was known as ManagementSuite, formed of two words: Management, as in project management and Suite, following the same metaphor about name of places.

The intent of Project is to provide project managers with the tools, methods and processes to help them deliver projects on time, within budget and with the expected level of quality. The processes and procedures are coherent with the principles and framework proposed in the Guide to the Project Management Body of Knowledge (PMBOK®) published by the Project Management Institute (PMI).

== Trademarks ==
Macroscope is a registered trademark of Fujitsu Consulting (Canada) Inc. a Fujitsu company.

== See also ==
- IBM Rational Unified Process

== Bibliography ==
- Ray McKenzie, The Relationship-Based Enterprise: Powering Business Success Through Customer Relationship Management, McGraw-Hill, 2001. ISBN 0-07-086081-5.
- John Thorp et al., The Information Paradox: Realizing the Business Benefits of Information Technology, McGraw-Hill, 2003. ISBN 0-07-092698-0.

== Portals ==
Portal:Business and economics
