= Objectory =

Objectory is an object-oriented methodology mostly created by Ivar Jacobson, who has greatly contributed to object-oriented software engineering.

The framework of objectory is a design technique called design with building blocks. With the building block technique, a system is viewed as a system of connecting blocks with each block representing a system service.

It is considered to be the first commercially available object-oriented methodology for developing large-scale industrial systems. This approach gives a global view of the software development and focuses on cost efficiency.

Its main techniques are: conceptual modelling, Object-oriented programming, and a block design technique.
