= Executable UML =

Software development method and a highly abstract software language

Executable UML (xtUML or xUML) is both a software development method and a highly abstract software language. It was described for the first time in 2002 in the book "Executable UML: A Foundation for Model-Driven Architecture". The language "combines a subset of the UML (Unified Modeling Language) graphical notation with executable semantics and timing rules." The Executable UML method is the successor to the Shlaer–Mellor method.

Executable UML models "can be run, tested, debugged, and measured for performance.", and can be compiled into a less abstract programming language to target a specific implementation. Executable UML supports model-driven architecture (MDA) through specification of platform-independent models, and the compilation of the platform-independent models into platform-specific models.

== Overview ==
Executable UML is a higher level of abstraction than third-generation programming languages. This allows developers to develop at the level of abstraction of the application. The Executable UML aims for separation of concerns. This is supposed to increase ease of reuse and to lower the cost of software development. This also enables Executable UML domains to be cross-platform. That means it is not tied to any specific programming language, platform or technology.

Executable UML also allows for translation of platform-independent models (PIM) into platform-specific models (PSM). The Executable UML method enables valuing the model as intellectual property, since the model is a fully executable solution for the problem space.

Actions are specified in action language. This means that the automatic generation of implementation code from Executable UML models can be output in an optimized form.

Executable UML is intended to serve as executable code as well as documentation. The models are a graphical, executable specification of the problem space that is compiled into a target implementation. They are also intended to be human-readable.

== Executable UML building blocks ==
A system is composed of multiple subject matters, known as domains in Executable UML terms. Executable UML is used to model a domain at the level of abstraction of its subject matter independent of implementation concerns. The resulting domain model is represented by the following elements:

- The domain chart provides a view of the domain being modeled, and the dependencies it has on other domains.
- The class diagram defines the classes and class associations for the domain.
- The statechart diagram defines the states, events, and state transitions for a class or class instance.
- The action language defines the actions or operations that perform processing on model elements.

=== Domain chart ===
Executable UML requires identification of the domains (also known as: aspects or concerns) of the system. "Each domain is an autonomous world inhabited by conceptual entities" Each domain can be modeled independent of the other domains in the system, enabling a separation of concerns. As an example, domains for an automated teller system may include the following:

- The application domain model of the automated teller's business logic.
- The security domain model of various issues regarding system security (such as authentication and encryption).
- The data access domain model of methods for external data usage.
- The logging domain model of the various methods through which the system can or must log information.
- The user interface domain model of the user interactions with the system.
- The architecture domain model of the implemented of the Executable UML model on the system's hardware and software platforms.

The separation of concerns enables each domain to be developed and verified independently of the other domains in the system by the respective domain experts.

The connections between domains are called bridges. "A bridge is a layering dependency between domains". This means that the domains can place requirements upon other domains. It is recommended that bridges are agreed upon by the different domain experts.

A domain can be marked as realized to indicate that the domain exists and does not need to be modeled. For example, a data access domain that uses a MySQL database would be marked as realized.

=== Class diagram ===
Conceptual entities, such as tangible things, roles, incidents, interactions, and specifications, specific to the domain being modeled are abstracted into classes. Classes can have attributes and operations.

The relationships between these classes will be indicated with associations and generalizations. An association may require further abstraction as an Association Class.

Constraints on the class diagram can be written in both Action Language and Object Constraint Language (OCL).

The Executable UML method limits the UML elements that can be used in an Executable UML class diagram.

An Executable UML class diagram is meant to expose information about the domain. Too much complexity in the statechart diagrams is a good indicator that the class diagram should be reworked.

=== Statechart diagram ===
Classes have lifecycles which are modeled in Executable UML with a statechart diagram. The statechart diagram defines the states, transitions, events, and procedures that define a class' behaviour.

Each state has only one procedure that is executed upon entry into that state. A procedure is composed of actions, which are specified in an action language.

=== Action language ===
The class and state models by themselves can only provide a static view of the domain. In order to have an executable model, there must be a way to create class instances, establish associations, perform operations on attributes, call state events, etc. In Executable UML, this is done using an action language that conforms to the UML Action Semantics.

Action Semantics was added to the UML specification in 2001. The Action Semantics RFP was based on previous work in action languages supporting the Shlaer–Mellor method. Existing action languages are Object Action Language (OAL), Shlaer–Mellor Action Language (SMALL), Action Specification Language (ASL), Model Action Specification Language (MASL), That Action Language (TALL), Starr's Concise Relational Action Language (SCRALL), Platform-independent Action Language (PAL) and PathMATE Action Language (PAL). SCRALL is the only one that is a graphical action language.

=== Model testing and execution ===
Once a domain is modeled, it can be tested independent of the target implementation by executing the model. Each domain can be verified and validated independent of any other domain. This allows errors detected to be associated with the domain and independent of other system concerns.

Verification will involve such things as human review of the models, performed by experts in the relevant domain, and automated checking of the Executable UML semantics. i.e., checking that the Executable UML model complies with the Executable UML metamodel.

Validation will typically involve use of an Executable UML tool to execute the model. The execution can occur either before or after model compilation.

=== Model compilation ===
In order to support execution on the target implementation, the domain model must be translated into a less abstract form. This translation process is called model compilation. Most model compilers target a known programming language, because this allows reuse of existing compiler technologies.

Optimizing the domain models for target implementation reasons will reduce the level of abstraction, adversely affect domain independence, and increase the cost of reuse. In executable UML, optimizations are done by the model compiler either automatically or through marking. Marking allows specific model elements to be targeted for specific lower-level implementations, and allows for broader architectural decisions, such as specifying that collections of objects should be implemented as a doubly linked list.

In MDA terms, the model compiler creates the PSM. The separation between the PIM and PSM in Executable UML disables the ability to round-trip engineer the model, and deters modifications to the PSM.

== Executable UML key aspects ==
Executable UML defines execution semantics for a subset of the UML. Key aspects of the Executable UML subset include the following:

- No support for implementation specific constructs, like aggregation and composition.
- Generalizations are always notated as {complete, disjoint}.
- Associations between classes are always named, have verb phrases on both ends specifying the roles, and have multiplicity specified on both ends.
- Multiplicities on association ends are restricted to 0..1 (zero to one), * (zero to many), 1 (exactly one), or 1..* (one to many).
- Data types are restricted to the following core data types: boolean, string, integer, real, date, timestamp, and arbitrary_id, or one of the following domain-specific data types: numeric, string, enumerated, and composite. Domain-specific numeric and string data types can represent subsets of the core data types. The domain-specific composite data type is to always be treated as a single unit within the domain. e.g., a MailingAddress composite data type could be declared, but city information couldn't be extracted from it.
- Constraints on the Executable UML models can either be represented as Object Constraint Language (OCL) or action language.

== fUML and ALF ==
The Object Management Group has standardized the Foundational UML (fUML), which was strongly influenced by Executable UML.

Action Language for Foundational UML (ALF), is a standard action language specification by the Object Management Group.

== See also ==
- Aspect (computer programming)
- Automatic programming
- Code generation (compiler)
- Model-driven architecture (MDA)
- Model-driven engineering (MDE)
- Shlaer–Mellor method
- Unified Modeling Language (UML)

== Publications ==
- Gerry Boyd (2003) "Executable UML: Diagrams for the Future." published at devx.com, February 5, 2003.
- Shayne Flint, and Clive Boughton (2003) "Executable/translatable UML and Systems Engineering." Practical Approaches for Complex Systems (SETE 2003).
- Shayne Flint, Henry Gardner, and Clive Boughton (2004). "Executable/Translatable UML in computing education." Proceedings of the Sixth Australasian Conference on Computing Education-Volume 30. Australian Computer Society, Inc.
- H.S. Lahman (2011). Model-Based Development: Applications. Addison-Wesley Professional. ISBN 0-321-77407-8.
- Stephen J. Mellor & Marc Balcer (2002). Executable UML: A Foundation for Model-Driven Architecture. Addison Wesley. ISBN 0-201-74804-5. Chapter 1 online
- Executable and Translatable UML
- Stephen J. Mellor (2004), Introduction to Executable and Translatable UML
- Stephen J. Mellor (2004), A Framework for Aspect-Oriented Modelling
- Chris Raistrick; et al. (2004). Model Driven Architecture with Executable UML. Cambridge University Press. ISBN 0-521-53771-1.
- Leon Starr (2002). Executable UML:How to Build Class Models. Prentice-Hall. ISBN 0-13-067479-6.
