= Richard Soley =

American computer scientist

Richard Mark Soley (born c. 1960, in Baltimore, Maryland, died 8 Nov., 2023, in Lexington, Massachusetts) was an American computer scientist and businessman, and chairman and CEO of the Object Management Group, Inc. (OMG). He was also the executive director of the Cloud Standards Customer Council, and executive director of the Industrial Internet Consortium, managed by the OMG.

== Life and work ==
Soley studied Computer Science and Engineering at the Massachusetts Institute of Technology, where he obtained his S.B. in 1982, his S.M. in 1985 and his Ph.D. in 1989. He began his professional life at Honeywell, working on the Multics operating system.

Soley joined OMG as Technical Director in 1989, leading the development of OMG's standardization process and the original CORBA specification.

In 1996, he led the effort to move into vertical market standards (starting with healthcare, finance, telecommunications and manufacturing) and modeling. Those efforts made OMG a major early adopter of Unified Modeling Language (UML) and model-driven architecture (MDA).

Soley was co-founder, former chairman, and CEO of A.I. Architects, Inc., a firm which manufactured hardware and software for personal computers and workstations. He has also served as a consultant on matters relating to software investment opportunities for several corporations including IBM, Motorola, and Texas Instruments.

He also played a very significant role within the SEMAT initiative, launched in December 2009.

== Selected publications ==
- Soley, Richard Mark. Object Management Architecture Guide: Revision 2.0. Wiley, 1995.
