= James Rumbaugh =

American computer scientist

James E. Rumbaugh (born August 22, 1947) is an American computer scientist and object-oriented methodologist who is best known for his work in creating the Object Modeling Technique (OMT) and the Unified Modeling Language (UML).

== Biography ==
Born in Bethlehem, Pennsylvania, Rumbaugh received a B.S. in physics from the Massachusetts Institute of Technology (MIT), an M.S. in astronomy from the California Institute of Technology (Caltech), and received a Ph.D. in computer science from MIT under Professor Jack Dennis.

Rumbaugh started his career in the 1960s at Digital Equipment Corporation (DEC) as a lead research scientist. From 1968 to 1994 he worked at the General Electric Research and Development Center developing technology, teaching, and consulting. At General Electric he also led the development of Object-modeling technique (OMT), an object modeling language for software modeling and designing.

In 1994, he joined Rational Software, where he worked with Ivar Jacobson and Grady Booch ("the Three Amigos") to develop Unified Modeling Language (UML). Later they merged their software development methologies, OMT, OOSE and Booch into the Rational Unified Process (RUP). In 2003 he moved to IBM, after its acquisition of Rational Software. He retired in 2006.

He has two grown up children and (in 2009) lived in Saratoga, California with his wife, Madeline Morrow.

== Work ==
Rumbaugh's main research interests are formal description languages, "semantics of computation, tools for programming productivity, and applications using complex algorithms and data structures".

In his graduate work at MIT, Rumbaugh contributed to the development of data flow computer architecture. His thesis described parallel programming language, parallel processor computer and a basis for a network architecture, which orients itself at data flow. Rumbaugh made further contributions to Object Modeling Technique, IDEF4, the Rational Unified Process and Unified Modeling Language.

== Publications ==
Rumbaugh has written a number of books about UML and RUP together with Ivar Jacobson and Grady Booch. A selection includes:

- 1975. A Parallel Asynchronous Computer Architecture For Data Flow Programs. MIT thesis
- 1991. Object-Oriented Modeling and Design. With others. Prentice Hall, ISBN 0-13-629841-9.
- 1996. OMT insights : perspectives on modeling from the Journal of Object-Oriented Programming. Foreword by James Coplien.
- 1999. Unified software development process
- 2005. Object-oriented modeling and design with UML
