= Philippe Kruchten =

Canadian software engineer

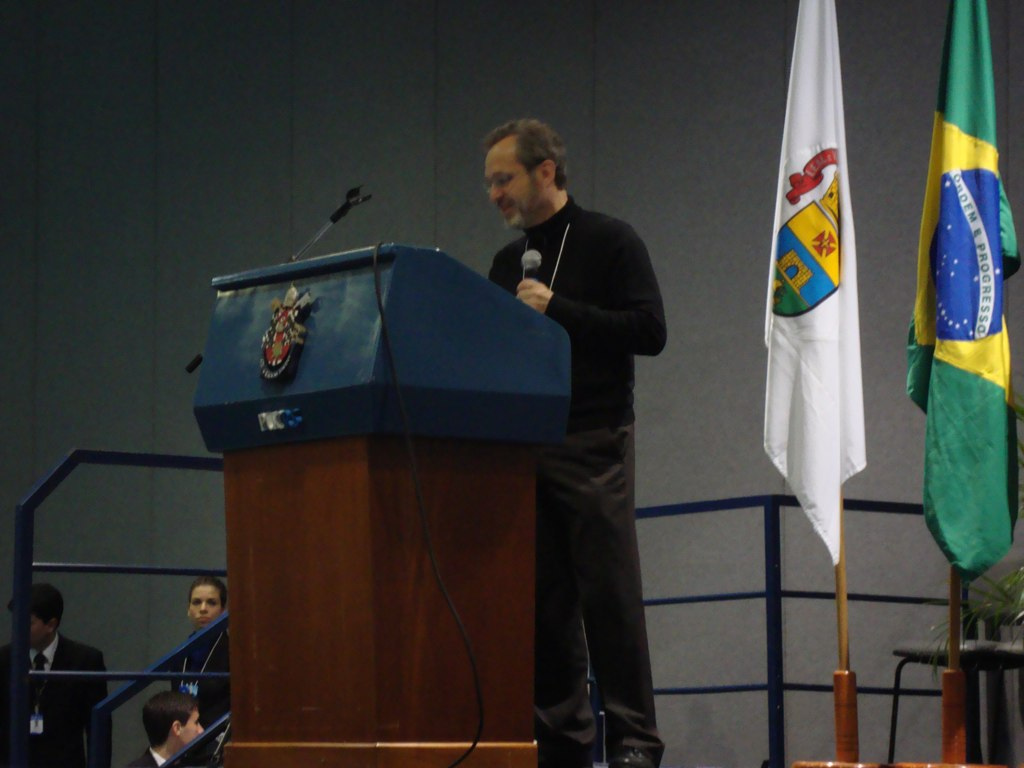
Philippe Kruchten

Philippe Kruchten (born 1952) is a Canadian software engineer, and Professor of Software Engineering at University of British Columbia in Vancouver, Canada, known as Director of Process Development (RUP) at Rational Software, and developer of the 4+1 Architectural View Model.

== Biography ==
In 1975, Kruchten received a bachelor's degree in mechanical engineering at the Ecole Centrale de Lyon in France, an MA in Software Engineering in 1978 at the École nationale supérieure des télécommunications in Paris, and a PhD in computer science from the French Institute of Telecommunications in 1986. In the new millennium in Canada he received a Certificate in Intercultural Studies from the University of British Columbia in 2002.

In 1974, Kruchten started working as a FORTRAN programmer in a French computer firm, stationed for three months at IBM in London. In 1976, he became an assistant professor at the Ecole Nationale Supérieure des Télécommunications, Paris for years, and has kept switching between the academic world and the computer industry ever since. In that time, he experienced the development of large, software-intensive systems in the areas such as telecommunication, defense, aerospace, transportation, and software development tools.

From 1996, he was Director of Process Development (RUP) at Rational Software, and kept this position when Rational was acquired by IBM in 2003. Since 2004, he holds a position as Professor of Software Engineering at the University of British Columbia in Vancouver, Canada. Since 2009 he holds an NSERC Chair in Design Engineering.

== See also ==
- Artifact (software development)

== Publications ==
Books:

- Kruchten, Philippe. The Rational Unified Process-An Introduction, Addison-Wesley, 1998; 3rd ed. in 2003;
- Kruchten, Philippe, and Per Kroll. Rational Unified Process Made Easy-A Practitioner's Guide to the RUP, Addison-Wesley, 2003.
- Kruchten, Philippe and Pierre Robillard, UPEDU: Unified Process for Education, Addison-Wesley, 2003.

Articles, a selection:

- Kruchten, Philippe. "Agile Architecture", https://philippe.kruchten.com/2013/12/11/agile-architecture/ (related presentation: http://www.sei.cmu.edu/library/assets/presentations/Kruchten%20100519%20agility%20architecture%20Saturn.pdf)
- Kruchten, Philippe, Patricia Lago, and Hans Van Vliet. "Building up and reasoning about architectural knowledge." Quality of Software Architectures. Springer Berlin Heidelberg, 2006. 43-58.
- Hofmeister, C., Kruchten, P., Nord, R. L., Obbink, H., Ran, A., & America, P. (2007). "A general model of software architecture design derived from five industrial approaches." Journal of Systems and Software, 80(1), 106-126.
- Kruchten, Philippe. "Voyage in the agile memeplex." Queue 5.5 (2007): 1.
- Kruchten, Philippe (1995, November). Architectural Blueprints — The “4+1” View Model of Software Architecture. IEEE Software 12 (6), pp. 42–50.
