= Rational Software =

Defunct software company

- Industry: Application development tools
- Founded: 1981
- Founder: Paul Levy and Mike Devlin
- Defunct: February 20, 2003
- Fate: Acquired by IBM
- Key people: Mike Devlin (previous CEO)
- Website: www.ibm.com/software/uk/rational/

Rational Machines was an enterprise founded by Paul Levy and Mike Devlin in 1981 to provide tools to expand the use of modern software engineering practices, particularly explicit modular architecture and iterative development. It changed its name in 1994 to Rational Software, and was sold for US$2.1 billion (equivalent to current US$3.68 billion) to IBM on February 21, 2003.

== See also ==
- Rational Automation Framework
- IBM DevOps Code ClearCase
- DOORS
- Rational Performance Tester
- Rhapsody (modeling)
- IBM Rational Rose
- Rational Software Modeler
- Rational Synergy
- Rational Unified Process
- Rational R1000
