= Culture of Urfa =

The culture of Urfa, Turkey is diverse and spans cuisine, literature and language.

== Cuisine ==
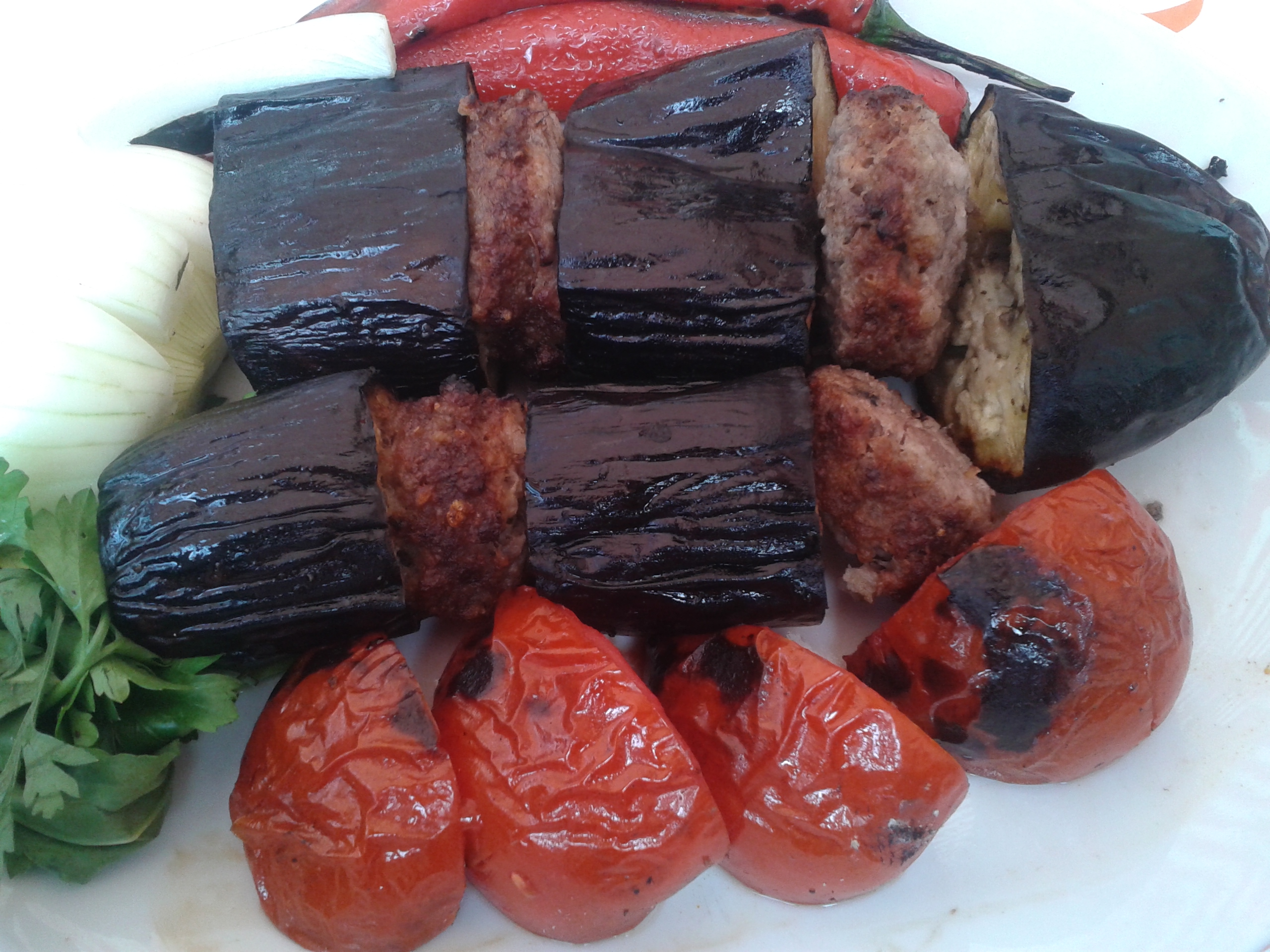
Patlıcan kebap, served at an Urfa-style restaurant in Ankara

As the city of Urfa is deeply rooted in history, so its unique cuisine is an amalgamation of the cuisines of the many civilizations that have ruled in Urfa . It is widely believed that Urfa is the birthplace of many dishes, including Çiğ köfte, that according to the legend, was crafted by the Prophet Abraham from ingredients he had at hand. Another legend attributes its creation to a nameless hunter's wife who, when her husband brought home a gazelle he'd killed, was unable to find firewood to cook it with because Nimrod had gathered all the wood for throwing Abraham into the fire. She improvised and took some lean meat from the gazelle's thigh, crushed it up, and mixed it with bulgur, red pepper, and salt, and then added parsley and green onions and served it raw.

Meat-based dishes are a staple of everyday meals in Urfa. There is a local saying, "There is no trouble where meat comes in" (Turkish: et giren yere dert girmez). Foods like lahmacun and kebab are consumed daily by many people. Ciğer kebabı, or liver kebab, is especially popular among poorer Urfalis, since liver is usually a relatively cheap meat. Liver kebab is popularly eaten for either breakfast, lunch, or dinner.

The walnut-stuffed Turkish dessert crepe (called şıllık) is a regional specialty. According to legend, its sweet syrup was first made using molasses from the Hanging Gardens of Babylon.

Urfa's local variety of cheese, known as "Urfa cheese" (Turkish: Urfa peyniri), is similar to cheeses from other nearby cities, such as Diyarbakır, Maraş, and Gaziantep. Although there is no single standardized way of producing it, it is typically made from sheep or goat milk and aged for anywhere from 3 to 7 months.

Some other specialties of Urfali cuisine include şöşbörek, tirit (a meal which, according to the medieval historian al-Tabari, was first made by the prophet Abraham), the appetizer "içli köfte", the dessert zerde, the beverage Urfa biyanbalısı, the biscuit külünçe, the soup lebeni çorbası, and a number of other dishes: Urfa ekşilisi, frenk çömleği, haşhaş kebabı, kazan kebabı, keme boranısı, kıymalı söğürme, Urfa kıymalısı, Urfa miftahi tas kebabı, pancar boranısı, eggplant kebab, saç kavurma, onion kebab, su kabağı yemeği, egg meatballs (yumurtalı köfte), üzmeli pilav, and isot pot (isot çömleği).

The Şanlıurfa Traditional Cuisine Museum (Şanlıurfa Geleneksel Mutfak Müzesi), located in the old Hacıbanlar house, is dedicated to the local cuisine.

== Hospitality ==
Urfali society traditionally places a great value on hospitality, and inviting guests over and sharing food with them has a special importance. Locals attribute this to the prophet Abraham, who according to legend never dined alone — he always had guests over to share his meals with. The locally common epithet "Halil İbrahim Sofrası" ("the tablecloth-like") depicts this characterization.

=== Sıra night ===
Although not strictly unique to Urfa, the Sıra night is a custom strongly associated with Urfa. A Sıra night is an evening gathering of male friends at the host's house, where the participants dine and converse together.

Çiğ köfte typically forms the main course of these meals, which typically begin with a retelling of the dish's legendary origins.

== Literature ==
Urfa has a long history of literature, going back to early Christian writers such as Bardaisan and Ibas of Edessa. A prominent medieval writer from Urfa was the 9th century Arabic author al-Ruhawi, whose Adab al-Tabib covered the topic of medical ethics. Later, from the 1600s to the 20th century, divan poetry became popular in Urfa. The popularity of divan poetry in Urfa is unusual because, by the 1600s, Urfa was not a major center of learning that would typically be expected to produce a lot of poetry. In all, 130 different Urfali poets are known from this period. A few of them are Nâbî, Ömer Nüzhet, Admî, Fehim, Hikmet, Şevket, Sakıb, and Emin. Many of them were Sufis, affiliated with orders like the Bektashis, Mevlevis, Naqshbandis, Qadiris, and Rifa'is; they gathered in places like the Hasanpaşa Medrese, the İhlasiye Medrese, the Hasan Paşa Medrese, the Sakıbiye Tekke, the Halil’ür Rahman Medrese, the Rızvaniye Medrese, the Dabbakhane Medrese, and the Eyyübî Medrese. Urfali divan poets almost exclusively used the ghazala form, with almost no known examples of the qasida.

In modern times, some of the prominent authors based in Urfa include A. Rezzak Elçi, Abdurrahman Karakaş, Ali Fuat Bilkan, Arif İnan, Bekir Urfalı, Celal Oymak, Cuma Ağaç, *Mehmet Faruk Habiboğlu, Fedli Keser, Fuat Rastgeldi, Halil Güçlü, Hanifi Düşmez, Hicri İzgören, Hüseyin Baykuş, H. Sami Nacar, İ. Halil Aycan, İ. Halil Baran, İbrahim Tezölmez, Kemal Oğuzlu, Mehmet Adil Oymak, Mehmet Bayırhan, Mehmet Emin Ercan, Mehmet Hazar, Mehmet Kurtoğlu, Meral Dalaman, Misbah Hicri, Mustafa Dişli, Müslüm Akalın, Müslüm Yücel, Necati Siyahkan, Necdet Karasevda, Nejat Karagöz, Osman Erkan, Osman Güzelgöz, Sabri Çepik, Serhat Sever, Seyyit Ahmet Kaya, Siraç Suman, Şükrü Alğın, Veysel Polat, Suut Kemal Yetkin, Mustafa Yazgan, Bekir Yıldız, and Mustafa Acar. There have also been authors who were born in Urfa but have worked elsewhere; they include Yılmaz Karakoyunlu, Aysel Özakın, Aydın Hatipoğlu, Akif İnan, Ragıp Karcı, İhsan Sezal, Atilla Maraş, Abdülkadir Karahan, Günel Altıntaş, and Sedat Şanver.

== Traditional house architecture ==
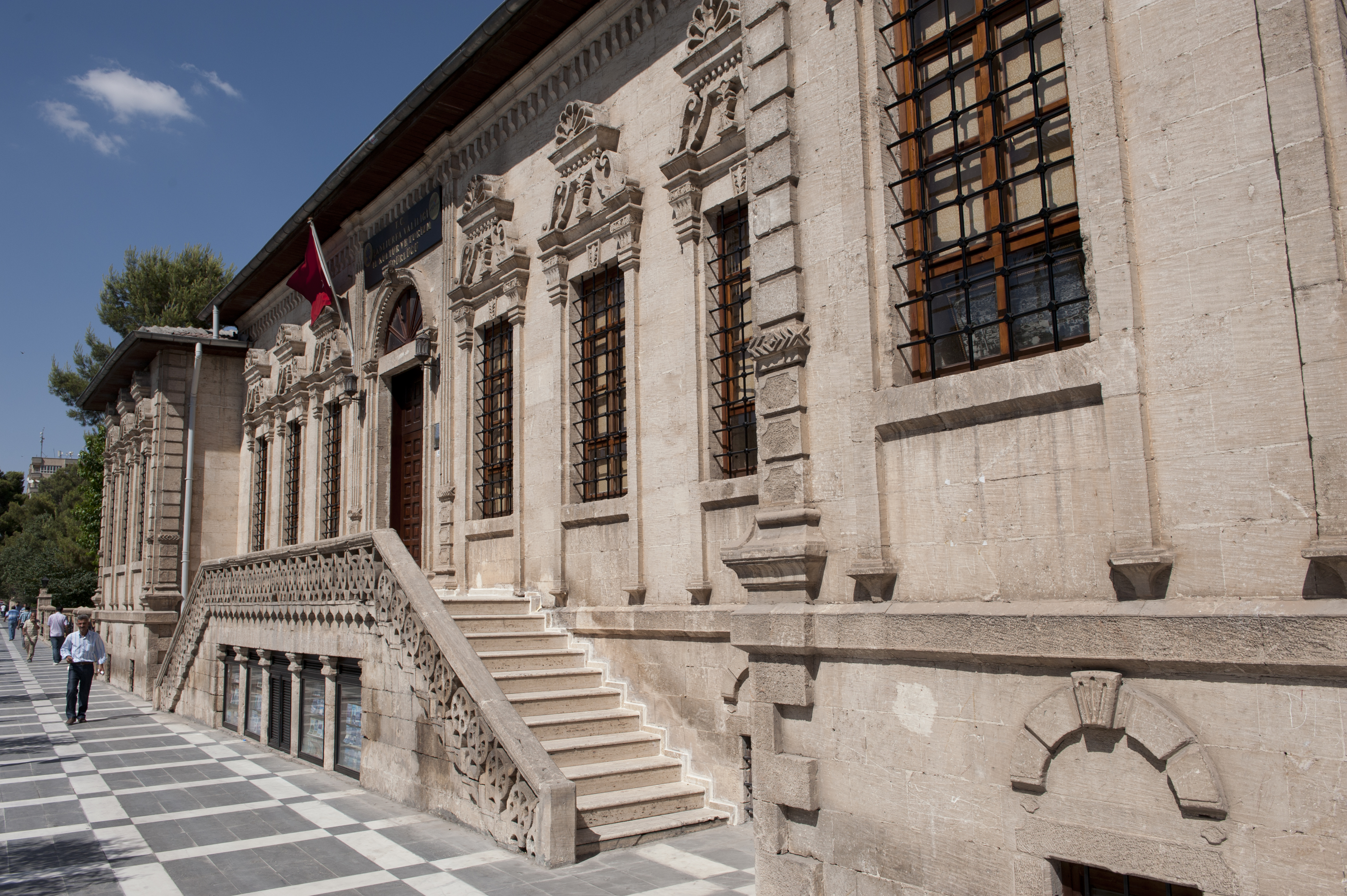
Şanlıurfa Provincial Directorate of Culture and Tourism Building

Urfa's old town has many old courtyard houses; many were built during a construction boom in the 19th century. A typical Urfa courtyard house is centered around a high-walled courtyard that is closed to the street. Facing the courtyard is a porticoed antechamber covered by a roof and partially surrounded by three walls. In Urfa, the name for this space is mastaba; elsewhere, the more general term is iwan. Other typical rooms include bedrooms, a kitchen (tandir), a sitting room, or a water closet. There is also a semi-basement called the zerzembe, which is used for winter food storage and is practically omnipresent in traditional Turkish homes in regions with hot climates. The house as a whole, with its courtyard, mastaba, and other rooms, forms one integrated living space rather than each room being its own "isolated, independent" space.

Together, the courtyard and mastaba form the most important part of the house. Except in very cold weather, most family activities would traditionally take place here. In particular, the courtyard is where women would traditionally gather to visit with each other during the day, while doing household tasks like lacework, knitting, or sewing, and moving about to whichever part of the courtyard was shaded. The courtyard's importance is such that in Turkish it is often called hayat — literally, "life". For privacy, the courtyard is surrounded by high walls to prevent passersby from looking in from the street. For the same reason, it is not entered directly from the street; instead, the front door leads to the dehliz, or entrance hall, where a second door opens onto the courtyard. Inside the courtyard, there is often a fountain and small garden. As for the mastaba, it is usually the grandest and most architecturally elaborate part of the house. It is an attractive place for people to sit because, in Urfa's hot climate, it remains relatively cool (so it is also called the "summer mastaba").

Traditional Urfa courtyard houses are often two-story. Rooms on the ground floor are called kab, after a regional word meaning "arch vault". Rooms on the upper floor are called çardak, or "arbor", and all open onto the gezenek, an open terrace accessed by stairs from the courtyard. Each room is internally divided into two parts: the entry space, called the gedemeç or papuçluk, and the main room space. Shoes must be removed in the gedemeç before proceeding to the main area. The main area is typically raised by about 20–30 cm above the gedemeç.

Urfa gets very hot in the summer, and it is often cooler to sleep on the roof than in the house. As a result, the roof is typically crowned by a parapet built high enough to protect the family's privacy.

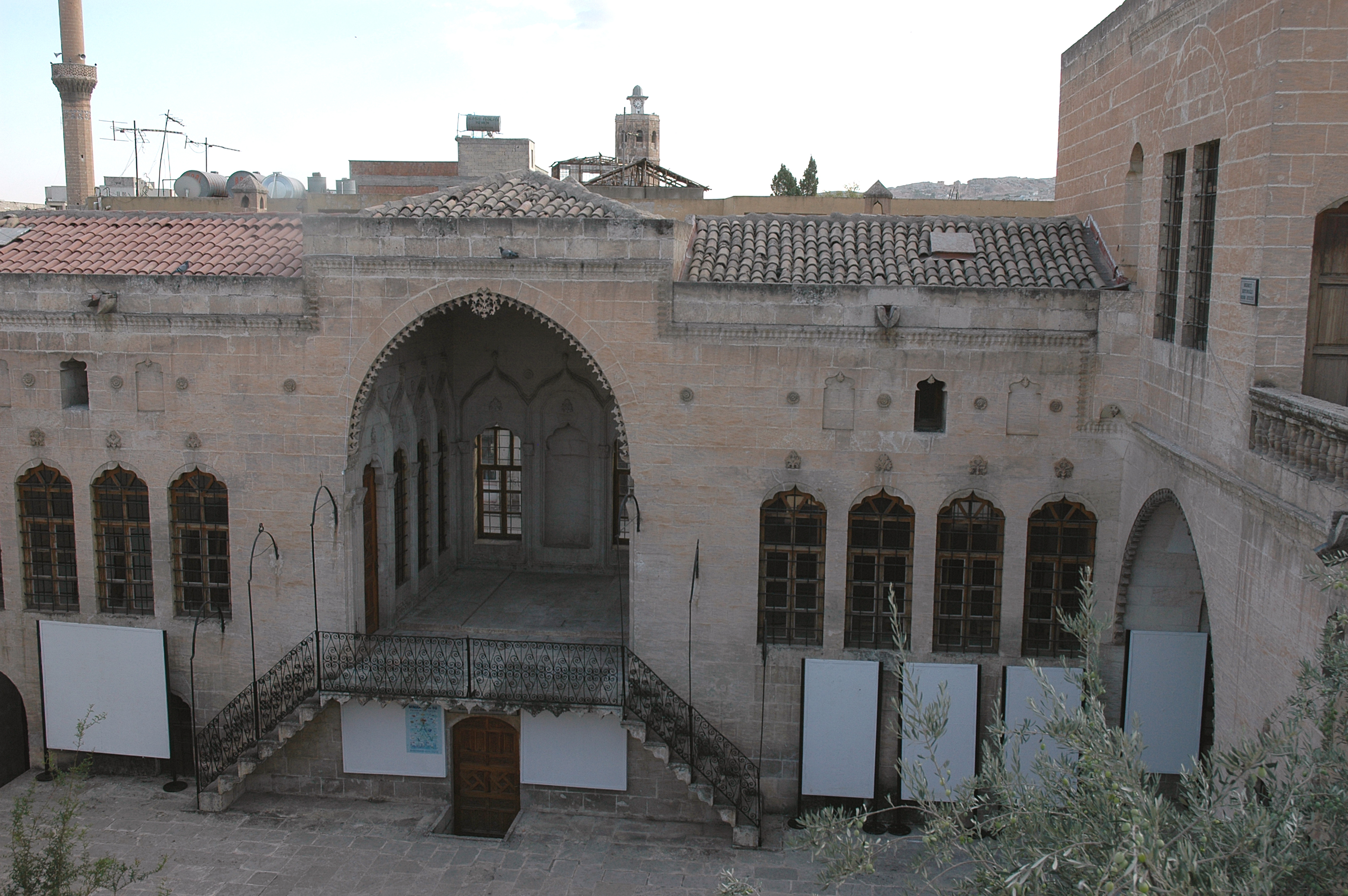
The Hacı Hafız house, now used as an art gallery, is a good example of traditional Urfa house architecture from the 1800s. The grand mastaba is in the middle. Below it is the entrance to the zerzembe.

An important consideration in domestic architecture is mahremiyat, which could roughly be translated into English as "privacy" or "intimacy" but which carries stronger implications. This concept is especially important when it comes to relations between men and women – outside the extended family, interaction between men and women is restricted. As a result, traditional Urfa houses are constructed in ways to prevent men outside from viewing the women of the household. For example, doors facing each other, windows facing the street, and significant differences in roof elevation are all avoided.

In wealthier households, the house would be built with separate haremlik and selamlik quarters; poorer and middle-class houses would not have this luxury. The haremlik is where the family lives; the selamlik is a "semi-public" space used to host male guests and shelter animals. The haremlik is generally larger and "better equipped" than the selamlik, since it is where most everyday family life is conducted. In larger houses, the selamlik may have its own courtyard, smaller than the haremlik's. The selamlik never has a second story since that would allow male visitors to see into the haremlik courtyard from above. In some houses there is a second floor above the selamlik, but it belongs to the haremlik and can only be accessed through that part of the house. In larger homes, the selamlik may also have its own separate entrance.

These courtyard houses are often built facing south, as this is the qibla direction here. Their water closets are typically tucked out of the way of the kitchen and oriented so that when they are used, a person's intimate parts on either the front or back are not facing the qibla.

Some distinct features of Urfa houses are separate summer and winter porticos (mastabas), microclimatic features to control heat, the multifunctionality of all the spaces, the fact that they can be used for daytime or nighttime activities, and the fact that men and women use the same areas so the house is not generally constructed with separate quarters for men and women.

== Local Turkish dialect ==
The Turkish spoken in Urfa has some features in common with the variety of Iraqi Turkmen spoken in Kirkuk, as well as some features owed to Arabic influence. For example, the Arabic sounds 'ayn, ghayn, and qāf are pronounced the same in Urfa as they are in Arabic, which is not done in standard Turkish.

As another example, Urfa Turkish has somewhat irregular vowel harmony compared to standard Turkish due to influence from Arabic. For example, standard Turkish has some words that do not conform to the usual vowel harmony patterns, such as elma ("apple") or anne ("mother"). In Urfa pronunciation, these words are regularized to follow vowel harmony — for the examples given, they become alma and ana, respectively. However, the reverse is always true — vowel harmony in certain other standard Turkish words gets broken in Urfa speech. For example, kebap becomes kübap and hamam becomes hemam in Urfa pronunciation. These shifts do not seem to follow any particular pattern.

The present-tense suffix -yor is contracted to -y in Urfa Turkish. For example, istiyorum ("I want") becomes istiyem. There are also other miscellaneous cases of sounds being elided in certain words: for example, standard Turkish avukat ("lawyer") becomes abkat in Urfa pronunciation, dakika ("minute") becomes dekke, and mahalle ("neighborhood") becomes mehle.

In some words, sounds are epenthesized (added to): for example, standard Turkish fırsat ("opportunity") becomes fırsant in Urfa pronunciation, gibi ("like, such as") becomes gibin, and elbet ("of course") becomes helbet.
