= Peer review (disambiguation) =

Peer review is the evaluation of work by one or more people with similar competencies as the producers of the work. It may also refer to:

== Types of peer review ==
- Clinical audit, a systematic review of healthcare against an explicit standard
- Clinical peer review, the process by which health care professionals evaluate each other's clinical performance
  - Medical peer review, the process of refereeing healthcare practitioner decisions
- Peer feedback, a classroom practice where students give each other feedback
- Physician peer review, the process by which physicians evaluate each other to promote better quality of care
- Scholarly peer review, the process of refereeing scholarly papers
- Sham peer review, the process of pseudo-review done for political purposes, often in healthcare
- Software peer review in software development
- Technical peer review in systems engineering

== Other uses ==
- Peer Review, a DLC for Portal 2
- Peer Review (magazine), an academic magazine

== See also ==
- Performance appraisal in the workplace
