= Grant (money) =

Non-repayable funds disbursed by one party to a recipient

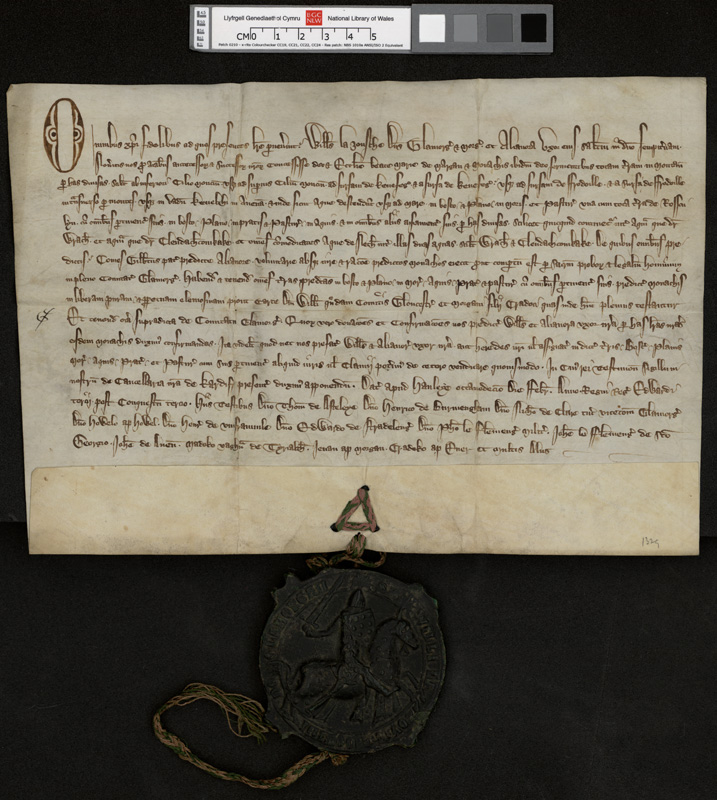
Latin grant dated 1329, written on fine parchment or vellum, with seal

A grant is money provided by a government, foundation, charity, company, or other funding body to an individual or organisation for a specified purpose, generally without an expectation of repayment provided that any attached conditions are met. Grants are used for purposes including education, research, charitable activity, public programmes, and business development. They are often time-limited and may be governed by a funding agreement setting out how the money is to be used and monitored.

Grant systems and requirements vary by country and funding body. Grants may be awarded through competitive application processes, including peer review or lottery, and recipients may be subject to accounting, compliance, monitoring, and reporting requirements. Major grant providers discussed in the article include institutions of the European Union, government departments and charitable organisations in the United Kingdom, and government agencies and public and private foundations in the United States. Research on public grants to businesses has found that some programmes can increase employment, sales, investment, and innovation.

== European Union ==
=== European Union grants ===
The European Commission provides financing through numerous specific calls for project proposals. These may be within Framework Programmes. Many seven-year programmes are periodically renewed to fund various initiatives. These include structural funds, youth programmes, and education initiatives. Occasionally, one-off grants address unforeseen issues or special projects. Most of these are administered through what are called National Agencies, but some are administered directly through the Commission in Brussels. Due to the complexity of the funding mechanisms involved and especially the high competitiveness of the grant application processes (14%) professional Grant Consulting firms are gaining importance in the grant writing process. EU grants should not be confused with EU tenders, although there can be some similarities.

Another funding body in Europe is the European Research Council established by the European Commission in 2007: see European Research Council#Grants offered. Similarly there are calls and various projects that are funded by this council.

The European Commission and the Council of Europe also operate a joint grant-funding programme.

=== Denmark ===
Denmark has an educational universal grant system, SU (Statens Uddannelsesstøtte, the State Education Fund). It is available to all students from 18 years of age, with no upper limit, who are currently taking courses. There are two systems of SU.

- Youth Education (Ungdomsuddannelse), available to all students in pre-university education (upper secondary education).
- Higher Education (Videregående Uddannelse), available to all students in post-secondary (higher education), is a coupon grant valid for 5 years and 10 months from beginning higher education.

In addition to the government grant scheme, more than 35,000 grants in Denmark exists, which is the second largest number of foundations in Europe by country. The foundations are estimated to possess 400 billion Danish kroner (US$60 billion) in accessible funds.

=== Ireland ===
Grant-giving organisations in Ireland include the Irish Research Council for Science, Engineering and Technology and Science Foundation Ireland for research grants.

=== Poland ===
Major grant organisations funded and operated by the government include:

- Polish Development Fund
- National Centre for Research and Development
- National Science Centre
- Medical Research Agency
- National Freedom Institute – Centre for Civil Society Development
- State Fund for Rehabilitation of Disabled People

== United Kingdom ==
Grants are made available in the United Kingdom for a variety of business, charitable and research purposes.

The biggest grant distributors are government departments and agencies which offer grants to third-party organisations (often a charitable organisation) to carry out statutory work on their behalf. Other major grant distributors in the United Kingdom are the National Lottery, charitable trusts and corporate foundations (through Corporate Social Responsibility policies). For example, Google contributes to the grants process through its Google Grants programme, where any charitable organisation can benefit financially from free Google Ads advertising if they share Google's social responsibility outcomes.

Grants are time limited (usually between one and three years) and are offered to implement existing government policies, to pilot new ways of doing things or to secure agreed outcomes. A grant will usually only be given for a specific project or use and will not usually be given for projects that have already begun. If a national government organisation has a funding agreement in place with an external organisation, the funding agency is required to monitor the use of the money it provides.

Over the years the discipline of writing grant bids has developed into a specialised activity. Many organisations employ fundraising professionals to carry out this work. In the United Kingdom, the fundraising profession is governed by The Institute of Fundraising and is independently regulated by the Fundraising Regulator in England, Wales, and Northern Ireland and by the Scottish Fundraising Standards Panel in Scotland. The grant writing process generally includes searching and proposal-writing for competitive grant funds. Traditional search methods – for example referring to the Charities Aid Foundation's Directory of Grant Making Trusts – are quickly becoming replaced by online fundraising tools.

=== Accounting practice ===
Grants are sometimes received in advance of the activity they are to resource, and would need to be returned to the funder if their purpose could not be fulfilled. Good accounting practice therefore requires that grant income is not recognised "until there is reasonable assurance that the entity will adhere to the conditions which are attached to the grant".

=== Anti-lobbying restrictions ===
In 2016, the UK Government introduced proposals to include an "anti-lobbying clause" in grant-funding agreements, i.e. payments which "support lobbying or activity intended to influence or attempt to influence Parliament, Government or political parties, or attempting to influence the awarding or renewal of contracts and grants, or attempting to influence legislative or regulatory action" would generally not be treated as eligible for grant funding and therefore funded organisations would need to fund these activities in some other way. The Scottish Government has indicated it would not be introducing similar measures.

=== Top grant-making charities ===
As of 2021, 6 out of the top 10 charities in England and Wales (as measured by expenditure on charitable activities) make grants to individuals and/or organisations.

- British Council makes grants to individuals and organisations.
- Wellcome Trust makes grants to individuals and organisations.
- Save the Children International makes grants to organisations.
- Arts Council England makes grants to individuals and organisations.
- Charities Aid Foundation makes grants to organisations.
- Cancer Research UK makes grants to individuals and organisations.

== United States ==
In the United States, grants most often come from a wide range of government departments or an even wider range of public and private trusts and foundations. According to the Foundation Center there are over 88,000 trusts and foundations in the country that collectively distribute more than $40 billion annually. Conducting research on trusts and foundations can be a slightly more intricate process, often requiring access to subscription-based directories or databases for comprehensive information.

Most often, education grants are issued by the government to students attending post-secondary education institutions. In certain cases, a part of a government loan is issued as a grant, particularly pertaining to promising students seeking financial support for continuing their educations.

Grant compliance and reporting requirements vary depending upon the type of grant and funding agency. In the case of research grants involving human or animal subjects, additional involvement with the Institutional Review Boards (IRB) and/or Institutional Animal Care and Use Committee (IACUC) is required.

- National Aeronautics and Space Administration (NASA) : NASA receives and evaluates both solicited and unsolicited grant proposals. The NASA Shared Services Center (NSSC) currently awards all new grants for NASA HQ, GSFC, NMO, Stennis and Dyrden. Awards are made in accordance with the NASA Grants and Cooperative Agreement Handbook
- National Institutes of Health (NIH)
  - The Center for Scientific Review (CSR) is the focal point at NIH for the conduct of initial peer review of grant and fellowship applications. It implements ways to conduct referral and review.
  - The Office of Extramural Research (OER) provides guidance to institutes in research and training programs conducted through extramural (grant, contract, cooperative agreement) programs.
  - The elements of successful NIH grant applications were recently discussed in PNAS.
- National Science Foundation (NSF)
  - Most NSF grants go to individuals or small groups of investigators who carry out research at their home campuses. Other grants provide funding for mid-scale research centers, instruments and facilities that serve researchers from many institutions. Still others fund national-scale facilities that are shared by the research community as a whole.
  - The NSF receives about 40,000 proposals each year, and funds about 10,000 of them. Those funded are typically the projects that are ranked highest in a merit review process. These reviews are carried out by panels of independent scientists, engineers and educators who are experts in the relevant fields of study, and who are selected by the NSF with particular attention to avoiding conflicts of interest. (For example, the reviewers cannot work at the NSF itself, nor for the institution that employs the proposing researchers.) All proposal evaluations are confidential (the proposing researchers may see them, but they do not see the names of the reviewers).

== Allocation ==
Grants can be allocated based on peer review or lottery.

== Grant effectiveness ==
Econometric evidence shows public grants for firms can create additionality in jobs, sales, value added, innovation and capital. For example, this was shown to be the case for large public R&D grants, as well as for public grants for small and medium-sized firms or tourism firms.

== See also ==
- Concession (contract)
- Funding
- Land grant
- Student financial aid
- Subsidized loan
- Subsidy
