= Sham peer review =

Medical peer review done for malicious purposes

Sham peer review or malicious peer review is a name given to the abuse of a medical peer review process to attack a doctor for personal or other non-medical reasons. The American Medical Association conducted an investigation of medical peer review in 2007 and concluded that while it is easy to allege misconduct and 15% of surveyed physicians indicated that they were aware of peer review misuse or abuse, cases of malicious peer review able to be proven through the legal system are rare.

== Legal basis ==
Those who maintain that sham peer review is a pervasive problem suggest that the Healthcare Quality Improvement Act (HCQIA) of 1986 allows sham reviews by granting significant immunity from liability to doctors and others who participate in peer reviews. This immunity extends to investigative activities as well as to any associated peer review hearing, whether or not it leads to a disciplinary (or other) action.

The definition of a peer review body can be broad, including not only individuals but also (for example, in Oregon), "tissue committees, governing bodies or committees including medical staff committees of a [licensed] health care facility...or any other medical group in connection with bona fide medical research, quality assurance, utilization review, credentialing, education, training, supervision or discipline of physicians or other health care providers."

The California legislature framed its statutes so as to allow "aggrieved physicians the opportunity to prove that the peer review to which they were subject was in fact carried out for improper purposes, i.e., for purposes unrelated to assuring quality care or patient safety". These statutes allow that a peer review can be found in court to have been improper due to bad faith or malice, in which case the peer reviewers' immunities from civil liability "fall by the wayside".

Those who practice sham peer review could draw out the process by legal maneuvering, and the fairness of a peer review that has been unduly delayed has been called into question. Many medical staff laws specify guidelines for the timeliness of peer review, in compliance with JCAHO standards.

== Medical peer review process ==
The medical peer review system is a quasi-judicial one. It is modeled in some ways on the grand jury / petit jury system. After a complainant asks for an investigation, a review body is assembled for fact-finding. This fact-finding body, called an ad hoc committee, is appointed by the medical Chief of Staff and is composed of other physician staff members chosen at the Chief of Staff's discretion. This ad hoc committee then conducts an investigation in the manner it feels is appropriate. This may include a review of the literature or an outside expert. Thus, there is no standard for impartiality and specifically no standard for due process in the "peer-review 'process' ."

Physicians that are indicted (and sanctioned) have the right to request a hearing. At the hearing, counsel is allowed. A second independent panel of physicians is chosen as the petit jury, and a hearing officer is chosen. The accused physician has the option to demonstrate conflicts of interest and attempt to disqualify jurors based on reasonable suspicions of bias or conflicts of interest in a voir dire process.

Although some medical staff bodies utilize the hospital attorney and accept hospital funds to try peer review cases, the California Medical Association discourages this practice. California has enacted legislation formally requiring the separation of the hospital and medical staff.

== Alleged cases ==
Some physicians allege that sham peer review is often conducted in retaliation for whistleblowing, although one study in 2007 suggested that such events were rare.

=== Khajavi v. Feather River Anesthesiology Medical Group ===
Those who disagree with the AMA point to the case of Nosrat Khajavi. In 1996, Khajavi, an anesthesiologist in Yuba City, California, disagreed with a surgeon over the appropriateness of cataract surgery for a patient and refused to attend during the procedure. Khajavi was subsequently terminated from his anesthesia group. He sued for wrongful termination under California Business & Professions' Code Section 2053, and the suit was allowed by the California Court of Appeals. In 2000, the court held that Khajavi was not protected from termination on the basis of advocating for what he felt was medically appropriate care. The court did not rule on the merits of the dispute.

=== Mileikowsky v. Tenet ===
A doctor was allegedly subject to multiple hearings for the same charges, and his rights to an expedited hearing were allegedly denied while a suspension was in place. On May 15, 2001, the California Medical Association filed an amicus curiae brief to emphasize legal protections meant to prevent physicians being arbitrarily excluded from access to healthcare facilities based on mechanisms such as summary suspension without a speedy hearing. This case was decided on April 18, 2005. The court ruled that the hearing officer in the case could indeed terminate the physician's peer review hearing based on grounds that the physician refused to cooperate on procedural and other matters necessary for the good conduct of the proceedings. Thus, the physician lost his membership and privileges at the hospital. Ironically, the same physician was brought into a peer review hearing at another facility a short time later. The hearing officer in that case also terminated the proceedings, this time due to the physician's failure to turn over certain evidence for use in the hearing. The physician challenged the termination through the court system arguing, contrary to the Tenet appellate court ruling, that California's peer review statutes never intended the hearing officer in peer review hearings to have such powers of termination. The California Supreme Court reviewed the case and agreed in April 2009. The High Court ruled, among other things, that peer review hearing officers must defer the question of termination to the panel of physicians who sit in judgment of each peer review hearing.

=== Roland Chalifoux ===
Roland Chalifoux, member of an advocacy organisation called the Semmelweis Society, had his medical license revoked in Texas in 2004 after numerous incidents including the death of a patient. The Texas State Board of Medical Examiners stated that Chalifoux's practices "constitute such a deviation from the standard of care that revocation of his license is the only sanction that will adequately protect the public". Chalifoux subsequently secured permission to practice in West Virginia, and alleges that the Texas board's actions constitute sham peer review.

=== Charles Williams, MD ===
Six years after Charles Williams, MD, an anesthesiologist was summarily suspended by University Medical Center of Southern Nevada, a federal jury in Las Vegas awarded Dr. Williams $8.8 million as compensation for the due process violations he experienced in his sham peer review. Before the trial, which began May 16, U.S. District Judge Philip Pro made a finding that Ellerton and UMC's medical staff had violated Williams' due process rights. That left only the question of damages for the jury. This case appears to be the highest jury verdict in the nation for sham peer review which has not been overturned.

=== Richard Chudacoff, MD ===
On May 28, 2008, without any notice or opportunity to be heard, the Medical Staff of UMC suspended Dr. Chudacoff's clinical privileges. As a result of this, UMC filed a report against Dr. Chudacoff with the National Practitioner Data Bank claiming that Dr. Chudacoff was a risk to patient safety and had inadequate skills. This led to the virtual destruction of Dr. Chudacoff's career. Dr. Chudacoff sued. U.S. District Court Judge Edward Reed opined that, in Nevada, a physician's hospital privileges are a constitutionally protected property right. The Ninth Circuit Court of Appeals then affirmed that Dr. Chudacoff's due process rights were violated by UMC. As well, the Medical Executive members lost their immunity under the HCQIA for failure to follow their bylaws. The case was settled out of court in favor of Dr. Chudacoff, under the cloak of confidentiality.

== Development of the Patient Safety Organization (PSO) ==
The Patient Safety and Quality Improvement Act of 2005 (Public Law 109-41) allows for the creation of Patient Safety Organizations, quality of care committees that can act in parallel with peer review boards. PSOs were authorized to gather information to be analyzed by hospital administrators, nurses, and physicians as a tool for systems failure analysis. They may be used by any healthcare entity except insurance companies, but must be registered with the AHRQ wing of the US Department of Health and Human Services.

In PSOs, root cause analysis and "near misses" are evaluated in an attempt to avert major errors. Participants in PSOs are immune from prosecution in civil, criminal, and administrative hearings.

== See also ==
- False accusations
- Subpoena duces tecum
