= Clinical peer review =

Evaluation process by health care professionals

Clinical peer review, also known as medical peer review, is the process by which health care professionals, including those in nursing and pharmacy, evaluate each other's clinical performance. A discipline-specific process may be referenced accordingly (e.g., physician peer review, nursing peer review).

Today, clinical peer review is most commonly done in hospitals, but may also occur in other practice settings including surgical centers and large group practices. The primary purpose of peer review is to improve the quality and safety of care. Secondarily, it serves to reduce the organization's vicarious malpractice liability and meet regulatory requirements. In the US, these include accreditation, licensure and Medicare participation. Peer review also supports the other processes that healthcare organizations have in place to assure that physicians are competent and practice within the boundaries of professionally accepted norms.

== Overview ==
Clinical peer review should be distinguished from the peer review that medical journals use to evaluate the merits of a scientific manuscript, from the peer review process used to evaluate health care research grant applications, and, also, from the process by which clinical teaching might be evaluated. All these forms of peer review are confounded in the term Medical Peer Review. Moreover, Medical peer review has been used by the American Medical Association (AMA) to refer not only to the process of improving quality and safety in health care organizations, but also to process by which adverse actions involving clinical privileges or professional society membership may be pursued. In addition, peer review methods are frequently used by state medical boards with respect to licensing decisions and complaint investigation. They are also used by insurance companies with respect to credentialing and utilization management processes.

=== Medicine ===
In US hospital settings, clinical peer review encompasses a wide variety of activities, whose scope varies across institutions. Virtually all programs perform retrospective medical record review (aka, case review) of the quality of care. Most also include Ongoing Professional Practice Evaluation (OPPE) and Focused Professional Practice Evaluation (FPPE) required by the Joint Commission since 2007. Many also include the management of disruptive behavior (see) and physician health programs.

Routine clinical peer review activity (performance assessment) is typically organized separately from the credentialing/privileging process (competence assessment), but the results of peer review inform those decisions. From a legal and regulatory perspective, however, the line is blurred. The definition of a peer review body can be broad, including not only individuals but also (for example, in Oregon), "tissue committees, governing bodies or committees including medical staff committees of a [licensed] health care facility...or any other medical group in connection with bona fide medical research, quality assurance, utilization review, credentialing, education, training, supervision or discipline of physicians or other health care providers."

Medical staffs generally rely on generic screens for adverse events to identify cases for peer review, even though that might not be the most efficient or effective method. These are generally applied through administrative data analysis, but referrals for peer review are frequently made by risk managers, nurses and medical staff. The median annual review volume is 1–2% of hospital inpatient admissions. Thus, case review may be the dominant form of adverse event analysis in US hospitals.

Case reviews are typically conducted by individual reviewers, but in nearly 70% of hospitals, most reviews are presented and discussed in a committee prior to final decision-making. Nurses now participate on physician review committees in the majority of programs. This extends the trend of the past decade for adoption of multi-specialty representation in the direction of multi-disciplinary peer review. Some of these committees now routinely assess nursing care during the case review process and may even directly address all improvement opportunities.

=== Nursing ===
The American Nurses Association published the first definition of nursing peer review in 1988. It includes the following statements:

The American Nurses Association believes nurses bare primary responsibility and accountability for the quality of nursing care their clients receive. Standards of nursing practice provide a means for measuring the quality of nursing care a client receives. Each nurse is responsible for interpreting and implementing the standards of nursing practice. Likewise, each nurse must participate with other nurses in the decision-making process for evaluating nursing care…Peer review implies that the nursing care delivered by a group of nurses or an individual nurse is evaluated by individuals of the same rank or standing according to established standards of practice…. Peer review is an organized effort whereby practicing professionals review the quality and appropriateness of services ordered or performed by their professional peers. Peer review in nursing is the process by which practicing registered nurses systematically access, monitor, and make judgments about the quality of nursing care provided by peers as measured against professional standards of practice.

In Nursing, as in other professions, peer review applies professional control to practice, and is used by professionals to hold themselves accountable for their services to the public and the organization. Peer review plays a role in affecting the quality of outcomes, fostering practice development, and maintaining professional autonomy. American Nurses Association guidelines define peer review as the process by which practitioners of the same rank, profession, or setting critically appraise each other's work performance against established standards. The professionals who are best acquainted with the requirements and demands of the role are the givers and receivers of the review.

Nursing peer review appears to have gained momentum as a result of growth of hospital participation in the American Nursing Association's Magnet Program. Even so, less than 7% of U.S. hospitals have qualified. Magnet hospitals must have at least 2 years of experience with a peer review evaluation process designed to improve practice and performance for all RNs for at least 2 years. The literature on nursing peer review is more limited than that which has been developed for physician peer review, and has focused more on annual performance appraisal than on case review. No aggregate studies of clinical nursing peer review practices have been published. Nevertheless, more sophisticated studies have been reported.

Nursing professionals have historically been less likely to participate or be subject to peer review. This is changing, as is the previously limited extensiveness (for example, no aggregate studies of clinical nursing peer review practices had been published as of 2010) of the literature on nursing peer review

Mostly what is mistakenly referred to as "peer review" in clinical practice is really a form of the annual performance evaluation. The annual performance review is a managerial process and does not meet the definition or outcomes needed related to peer review. Other organizational practices may violate the peer review guidelines set forth 1988 by the ANA 1988. The most frequent violation is the performance of direct care peer review by managers. One of the reasons for the confusion is that the ANA guidelines for peer review had been out of print prior to being reprinted and updated in 2011.

The early ANA Peer Review Guidelines (1988) and Code of Ethics for Nurses (2001) focus on maintaining standards of nursing practice and upgrading nursing care in three contemporary focus areas for peer review. The three dimensions of peer review are: (a) quality and safety, (b) role actualization, and (c) practice advancement. Each area of contemporary peer review has an organizational, unit, and individual focus. The following six peer review practice principles stem from and are grounded in the 1988 ANA Guidelines and may help to assure an evidence-based and consistent approach to peer review: 1. A peer is someone of the same rank. 2. Peer review is practice focused. 3. Feedback is timely, routine and a continuous expectation. 4. Peer review fosters a continuous learning culture of patient safety and best practice. 5. Feedback is not anonymous. 6. Feedback incorporates the developmental stage of the nurse.

Written and standardized operating procedures for peer review also need development and adoption by the direct care staff and incorporation into the professional practice model (shared governance) bylaws.

Confusion exists about the differences between the Professional Peer Review process, the Annual Performance Review (APR) and the role of peer evaluation. The APR is a managerial human resource function performed with direct reports, and is aimed at defining, aligning and recognizing each employee's contribution to the organization's success. In contrast, professional peer review is conducted within the professional practice model and is not a managerial accountability. Peer evaluation is the process of getting feedback on one's specific role competencies or "at work" behaviors from people that one works within the department and from other departments. "Colleague evaluation" is a more appropriate term than "peer evaluation" as this is not a form of professional peer review.

=== Pharmacy ===
There is limited published information about peer review among pharmacists.

== History ==
The first documented description of a peer review process is found in the Ethics of the Physician written by Ishāq bin Ali al-Rahawi (854–931) of al-Raha, Syria. His work, as well as later Arabic medical manuals, states that a visiting physician must always make duplicate notes of a patient's condition on every visit. When the patient was cured or had died, the notes of the physician were examined by a local medical council of other physicians, who would review the practicing physician's notes to decide whether his or her performance met the required standards of medical care. If their reviews were negative, the practicing physician could face a lawsuit from a maltreated patient. Such practices are known to have continued into the 11th century.

In the 1900s, peer review methods evolved in relation to the pioneering work of Codman's End Result System and Ponton's concept of Medical Audit. Lembcke, himself a major contributor to audit methodology, in reviewing this history, notes the pre-emptive influence of hospital standardization promoted by the American College of Surgeons (ACS) following WWI. The Joint Commission (on Accreditation of Hospitals) followed the ACS in this role from 1952. Medicare legislation, enacted in 1964, boosted the stature and influence of the Joint Commission because the conditions for hospital participation required a credible medical care review program and the regulations stipulated that Joint Commission accreditation would guarantee payment eligibility. What was once a sporadic process, became hardwired in most hospitals following the medical audit model. The widespread creation of new programs was hampered, however, by limitations in the available process models, tools, training and implementation support.

Medical audit is a focused study of the process and/or outcomes of care for a specified patient cohort using pre-defined criteria. Audits are typically organized around a diagnosis, procedure or clinical situation. It remains the predominant mode of peer review in Europe and other countries.

In the US, however, the lack of perceived effectiveness of medical audit led to revisions of Joint Commission standards in 1980. Those modified standards dispensed with the audit requirement and called for an organized system of Quality Assurance (QA). About the same time, hospital and physicians were facing escalating malpractice insurance costs. In response to these combined pressures, they began to adopt "generic screens" for potential substandard care. These screens were originally developed to evaluate the feasibility of a no-fault medical malpractice insurance plan and were never validated as a tool to improve quality of care. Despite warnings from the developers, their use became widespread. In the process, a QA model for peer review evolved with a narrow focus on the question of whether or not the standard of care had been met. It has persisted despite the many criticisms of its methods and effectiveness. Today, its methods are increasingly recognized to be outdated and incongruent with the Quality Improvement (QI) principles that have been increasingly embraced by healthcare organizations.

There is good evidence that contemporary peer review process can be further improved. The American College of Obstetrics and Gynecology has offered a Voluntary Review of Quality of Care Program for more than 2 decades. Perceived issues with the adequacy of peer review were an explicit reason for requesting this service by 15% of participating hospitals, yet recommendations for improved peer review process were made to 60%. A 2007 study of peer review in US hospitals found wide variation in practice. The more effective programs had more features consistent with quality improvement principles. There were substantial opportunities for program improvement. The implication was that a new QI model for peer review seems to be evolving.

While it is premature to judge the potential effectiveness of this model, a 2009 study confirmed these findings in a separate sampling of hospitals. It also showed that important differences among programs predict a meaningful portion of the variation on 32 objective measures of patient care quality and safety. These findings were extended by cohort follow-up studies conducted in 2011 and 2015–16.

The 2015-16 study refined QI model identifying 20 features that distinguish the most effective programs. These include among other factors: aiming first and foremost at improving quality, standardizing review process, maintaining high quality of case review, promoting self-reporting of adverse events, near misses and hazardous conditions, identifying opportunities for improvement in the review process (as opposed to casting blame), providing timely clinical performance feedback, recognizing clinical excellence, and establishing effective program governance. as additional multivariate predictors of the impact of clinical peer review on quality and safety, medical staff perceptions of the program, and clinician engagement in quality and safety initiatives. The online supplement to the report includes a program self assessment tool which is also available as a free online utility. Despite a persistently high annual rate of major program change, about two-thirds of programs still have significant opportunity for improvement. It is argued that the outmoded QA model perpetuates a culture of blame that is toxic to efforts to advance quality and high reliability among both physicians and nurses.

== Legal and regulatory environment ==
=== United States ===
In the US, peer review activity is generally protected under state statutes. The protection may include confidentiality of the review process and protection to reviewers and institutions for good faith efforts to improve quality and safety through review activity. Such statutes may also specify whether or not the physician conducting the review must be in active practice. The nature of that protection varies widely. For example, Texas is generally considered to have fairly robust protections, whereas Florida protections were undermined by a constitutional amendment that exposed peer review data to discovery.

==== Health Care Quality Improvement Act ====
US federal law generally trumps state law. The federal Health Care Quality Improvement Act ("HCQIA"), 42 U.S.C. § 11112, enacted in 1986, sets standards that professional review actions must meet in order to receive protection under the Act. It requires that the action be taken in the reasonable belief that it will advance healthcare quality based on facts obtained through reasonable efforts with due process and fairness to the involved physician. When peer review leads to an action to limit or revoke clinical privileges, the physician is entitled to both a fair hearing and the right of appeal.

Congress explicitly stated the rationale for this legislation as follows:

(1) The increasing occurrence of medical malpractice and the need to improve the quality of medical care have become nationwide problems that warrant greater efforts than those that can be undertaken by any individual State. (2) There is a national need to restrict the ability of incompetent physicians to move from State to State without disclosure or discovery of the physician's previous damaging or incompetent performance. (3) This nationwide problem can be remedied through effective professional peer review. (4) The threat of private money damage liability under Federal laws, including treble damage liability under Federal antitrust law, unreasonably discourages physicians from participating in effective professional peer review. (5) There is an overriding national need to provide incentive and protection for physicians engaging in effective professional peer review.

From the time of the HCQIA, there has been good alignment between regulatory and accrediting bodies with respect to due process requirements for physician disciplinary actions. These formalities apply primarily to questions of competence (credentialing and privileging) rather than performance (routine clinical peer review). It would be most unusual to find a hospital whose medical staff bylaws did not conform.

==== National Practitioner Data Bank ====
HCQIA enabled the creation of a National Practitioner Data Bank and required hospitals, state medical boards and other health care entities who engage in formal peer review activities to report all disciplinary actions that affect clinical privileges for more than 30 days. This includes incidents in which a provider voluntarily resigns privileges while under investigation. An entity that fails to report as required may lose HCQIA protections for three years.

The HCQIA (§ 11135) requires hospitals to query the NPDB in their initial credentialing and bi-annual provider re-credentialing processes. Structurally, this process fulfills the congressional intention of restricting movement of incompetent physicians. Disciplinary actions may be a red flag for issues of global incompetence, but the problem may be focal, not global. Thus, the NPDB has been criticized for having the unintended consequence of having adverse economic impact on providers who were reported regardless of the magnitude of the issue. Even so, gross under-reporting of adverse actions remains an issue.

==== Patient Safety and Quality Improvement Act ====
The Patient Safety and Quality Improvement Act of 2005 ("Patient Safety Act"), Public Law 109–41, USC 299b-21-b-26 amended title IX of the Public Health Service Act to create a general framework to support and protect voluntary initiatives to improve quality and patient safety in all healthcare settings through reporting to Patient Safety Organizations (PSO). This was intended to include peer review. The final rule promulgated by the Agency for Healthcare Research and Quality in 2008 at 42 CFR Part 3 also includes protections against reprisals for good-faith reporters of adverse events, near misses and hazardous conditions. Several Florida health systems subsequently formed PSOs in expectation of using federal statutory protections to maintain the confidentiality of peer review activity that would have been exposed under Amendment 7. The subsequent legal challenges to this strategy go beyond the scope of this article.

== External peer review ==
In the US, following enactment of the HCQIA, executives from various national medical associations and health care organizations formed the non-profit American Medical Foundation for Peer Review and Education to provide independent assessment of medical care.

A 2007 study showed that the vast majority of physician peer review is done "in house": 87% of US hospitals send less than 1% of their peer review cases to external agencies. The external review process is generally reserved for cases requiring special expertise for evaluation or for situations in which the independent opinion of an outside reviewer would be helpful. The process is significantly more costly than in-house review, since the majority of hospital review is done as a voluntary contribution of the medical staff.

Mandated external peer review has not played an enduring role in the US, but was tested back in the 70s. A 1972 amendment to the Social Security Act established Professional Standards Review Organizations (PSRO) with a view to controlling escalating Medicare costs through physician-organized review. The PSRO model was not considered to be effective and was replaced in 1982 by a further act of Congress which established Utilization and Quality Control Peer Review Organizations (PROs). This model too was fraught with limitations. Studies of its methods called into question its reliability and validity for peer review. A survey of Iowa state medical society members in the early 90s regarding perceptions of the PRO program illustrated the potential harm of a poorly designed program. Furthermore, the Institute of Medicine issued a report identifying the system of care as the root cause of many instances of poor quality. As a result, in the mid-90s, the PROs changed their focus and methods; and began to de-emphasize their role as agents of external peer review. The change was completed by 2002, when they were renamed Quality Improvement Organizations.

In contrast, external peer review has been used by German hospitals to lower their standardized mortality rate

== Abuse ==
Sham peer review is a name given to the abuse of a medical peer review process to attack a doctor for personal or other non-medical reasons. State medical boards have withheld medical records from court to frame innocent physicians as negligent. Another type of review similar to sham peer review is "incompetent peer review," in which the reviewers are unable to accurately assess the quality of care provided by their colleagues.

Controversy exists over whether medical peer review has been used as a competitive weapon in turf wars among physicians, hospitals, HMOs, and other entities and whether it is used in retaliation for whistleblowing. Many medical staff laws specify guidelines for the timeliness of peer review, in compliance with JCAHO standards, but state medical boards are not bound by such timely peer review and occasionally litigate cases for more than five years. Abuse is also referred to as "malicious peer review" by those who consider it endemic, and they allege that the creation of the National Practitioner Data Bank under the 1986 Healthcare Quality Improvement Act (HCQIA) facilitates such abuse, creating a 'third-rail' or a 'first-strike' mentality by granting significant immunity from liability to doctors and others who participate in peer reviews.

The American Medical Association conducted an investigation of medical peer review in 2007 and concluded that while it is easy to allege misconduct, proven cases of malicious peer review are rare. Parenthetically, it is difficult to prove wrongdoing on behalf of a review committee that can use their clinical and administrative privileges to conceal exculpatory evidence.

The California legislature framed its statutes so as to allow that a peer review can be found in court to have been improper due to bad faith or malice, in which case the peer reviewers' immunities from civil liability "fall by the wayside".

Various incidents reporting deception from healthcare institutions have been documented. Some pertain to communication with peer review committees, and others regarding patient care. There is overlap in the motivations of the institutions involved in both these types.

Incidents of alleged sham peer review are numerous and include cases such as Khajavi v. Feather River Anesthesiology Medical Group, Mileikowsky v. Tenet, and Roland Chalifoux.

Defenders of the Health Care Quality Improvement Act state that the National Practitioner Data Bank protects patients by helping preventing errant physicians who have lost their privileges in one state from traveling to practice in another state. Physicians who allege they have been affected by sham peer review are also less able to find work when they move to another state, as Roland Chalifoux did. Moreover, neither opponents or supporters of the NPDB can be completely satisfied, as Chalifoux' case shows that just as physicians who were unjustly accused may be deprived of work in this way, those who have erred might still find work in other states.

== See also ==
- Subpoena duces tecum
- Utilization management
