= Trit =

Trit may refer to:

- Ternary digit, see Ternary numeral system
- Tirit, an ancient recipe using leftovers
