= Pagpag =

Filipino word for leftover food from restaurants

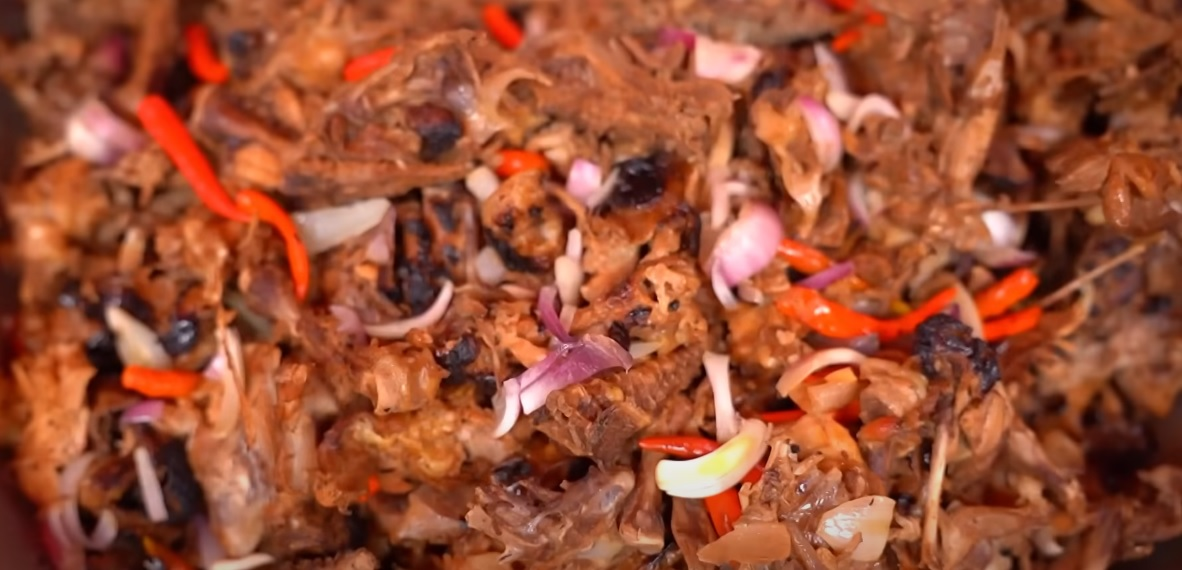
Pagpag

Pagpag is the Tagalog term for leftover food from restaurants (usually from fast food restaurants) that is salvaged from garbage sites and dumps. Preparing and eating pagpag is practiced in the slums of Metro Manila, such as Caloocan, Tondo, and Pasig. It arose from the challenges of hunger that resulted from extreme poverty among the urban poor.

Pagpag food can also be expired frozen meat, fish, or vegetables discarded by supermarkets and scavenged in garbage trucks where this expired food is collected. The word in the Tagalog language literally means "to shake off the dust or dirt". Pagpag are cooked again in a variety of ways before consumption.

Pagpag is also called batchoy, a euphemistic term derived from the Filipino dish with the same name. Technically, batchoy is soup-based, though the term batchoy referring to leftover food from the trash may be a meal cooked differently, like fried pagpag batchoy.

== History ==
Pagpag's origin resulted from extreme poverty, beginning in the 1960s during the 21-year dictatorship of President Ferdinand Marcos. During this period, the country experienced a debt crisis and severe underemployment, intensifying extreme poverty in the process. These social issues forced many to migrate to urban centers, notably Manila, to pursue opportunities. Majority of these immigrants originated from the Visayas and Bicol regions, with a few originating from Mindanao and other Tagalog regions. These migrants later became informal settlers in Tondo, establishing communities such as Barangay 649 and "Happy Land", a positive connotation of the word "hapilan" meaning "garbage dump" in the Cebuano language. These communities utilized scrap protein from various sources, but the expansion of fastfood joints in the late 80s and 90s allowed the practice to become widespread amongst the urban poor of Metro Manila.

== Preparation ==
After dirt and inedible substances are removed then pagpag are processed further, most commonly by washing them, and then frying them in hot oil depending on the kind of food. Small cottage industries have arisen around pagpag with impoverished people making a living scavenging, collecting, processing, and selling the processed pagpag to other financially challenged people. A cook in a restaurant in Tondo, Manila prepares pagpag in traditional Filipino cooking, such as pagpag à la kaldereta or adobo, with the mixture of the leftover chicken from Jollibee and KFC as the main ingredient.

== Health concerns ==
Health risks include ingestion of poisons, toxins, and food-borne illnesses. The National Anti-Poverty Commission warns against eating pagpag because of the threat of malnutrition and diseases such as Hepatitis A, typhoid, diarrhea, and cholera.

== Discouragement of consumption ==
Hunger has been linked to the spread of pagpag food and the food crisis in 2008 was said to be the cause in the rise of poverty in the Philippines. The National Statistical Coordination Board recommended the administration of Philippine President Benigno Aquino III to reduce poverty. Department of Social Welfare and Development Secretary Dinky Soliman said that the government has been addressing the issue and helping the poor through feeding programs and conditional cash transfers. In 2014, a survey conducted by the Social Weather Stations revealed that incidence of hunger in the Philippines was reduced but the Trade Union Congress of the Philippines-Nagkaisa attributed the decrease of hunger to the rapid spreading of pagpag.

Zero waste management is seen as a viable solution in stopping the proliferation of pagpag food.

== Media coverage ==
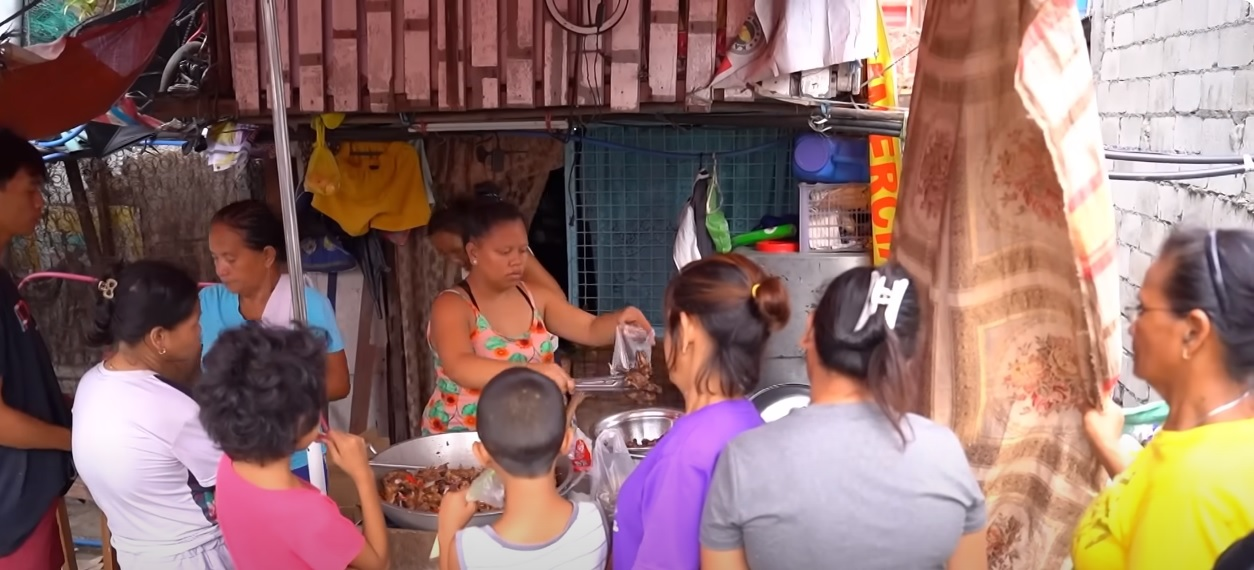
Selling pagpag in a poor neighborhood in Manila

Extreme hunger among the Metro Manila urban poor in the Philippines that features pagpag has been covered in various television documentaries. In 2003, the episode entitled "Basurero" (garbage collector) of the documentary show I-Witness of GMA Network tells a story of poor people collecting leftovers from the trash of fast food restaurants. In the said episode, those people who scavenged for food in trash are called magbabatchoy, which was derived from the word batchoy, a popular Filipino dish. As shown in ABS-CBN in 2006, Probe, another documentary show, features pagpag and mentions health risks of eating pagpag.

After CNN reported about pagpag in 2012, the reality about problems of hunger in the Philippines was brought to the world's attention. The San Diego Tribune also featured an article about residents of Payatas preparing pagpag in celebration of Pope Francis's visit to the Philippines. In February 2018, BBC News published a 3-minute long mini-documentary showing how pagpag is made, whereby the team followed a bag of meat from the rubbish dump to the dinner table.

Frequent sensationalist media coverage of pagpag, and Tondo poverty in general, has been criticized as an example of poverty porn.

== Other uses of the word ==
In common use, pagpag means the act of shaking off dust or dirt. Pagpag is also a Filipino term for a superstition saying one can never go directly to one's home after attending a funeral unless they have done the pagpag. This practice is observed to avoid the following of the dead's soul to the home of the visitor of the wake.

== See also ==
- Freeganism
- Dumpster diving
- Food rescue
- Double-dead meat
- Roadkill cuisine
- Bushmeat
- Famine food
- Poverty porn
