= Leftovers =

Uneaten edible remains of a meal

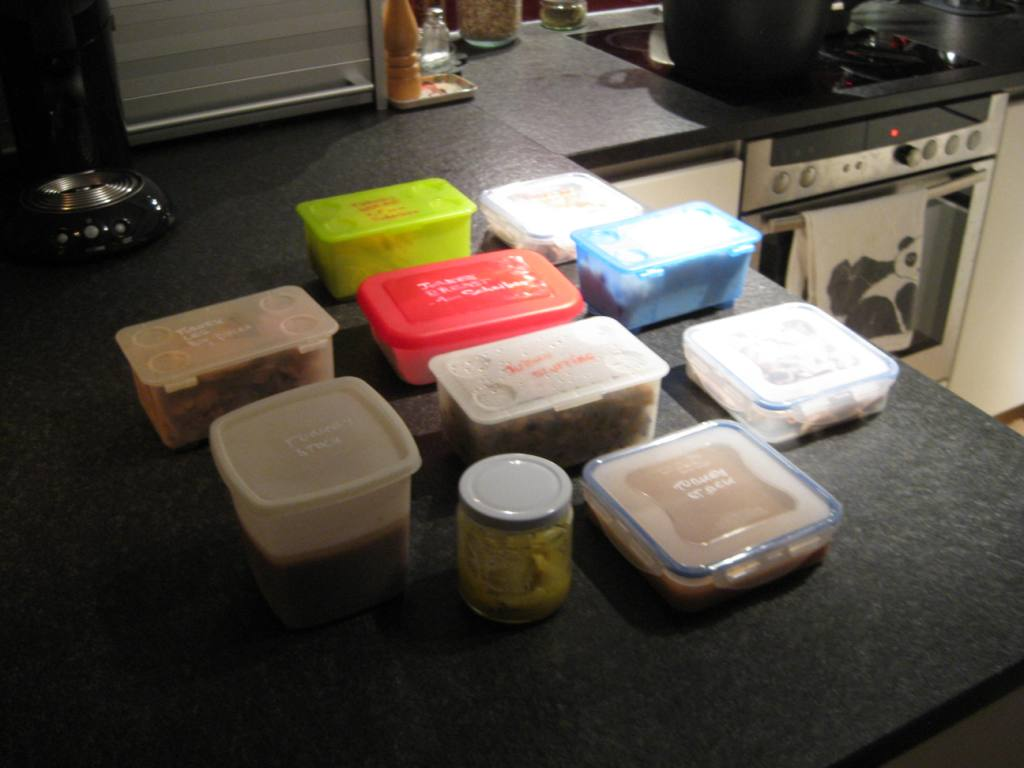
Packaged leftovers from a Thanksgiving dinner

Leftovers are foods remaining unconsumed at the end of a meal, which may be saved for eating later. Inedible remains like bones are considered waste, not leftovers. Depending on the situation, the amount of food, and the type of food, leftovers may be saved or thrown away. The use of leftovers depends on where the meal was eaten, the preferences of the diner, and the local culture. Leftovers from meals at home are often eaten later. This is facilitated by the private environment and convenience of airtight containers and refrigeration. People may eat leftovers directly from the refrigerator, reheat them, or use them as ingredients to make a new dish. At restaurants, uneaten food from meals is sometimes taken by diners for later consumption.

== Leftover cuisine ==
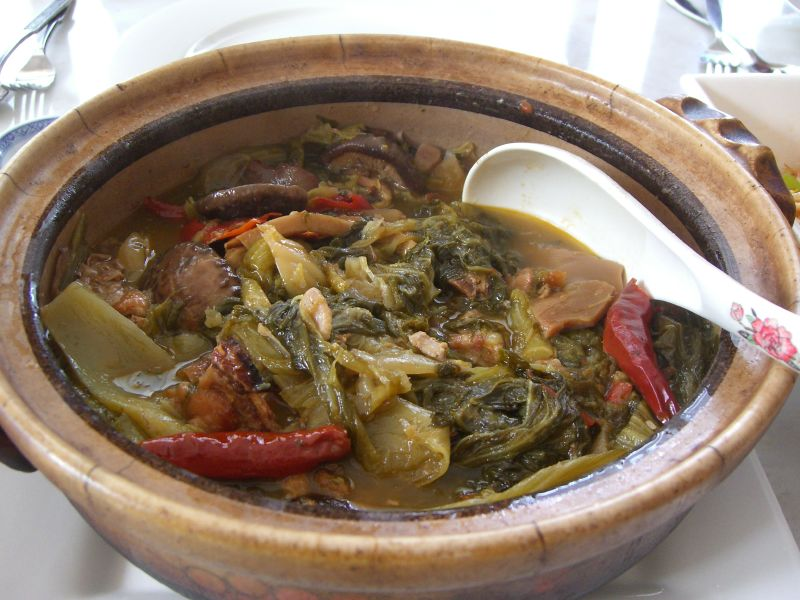
A stew prepared from leftovers

New dishes made from leftovers have long been common worldwide. Besides capturing nutrition from otherwise inedible bones, stocks and broths provide a base for leftover scraps too small to be a meal themselves. Casseroles, paella, fried rice, Shepherd pies, and pizza can also be used for this purpose, and may even have been invented as a means of reusing leftovers. Among American university students, leftover pizza is popular to the extent that the USDA discusses the considerable risks of eating unrefrigerated leftover pizza.

At some holiday meals, such as Christmas and Thanksgiving in the United States, it is customary to prepare much more food than necessary, specifically so the host can send leftovers home with guests. Cold turkey is archetypal in the United States as a Thanksgiving leftover, with turkey meat often reappearing in sandwiches, soups, and casseroles for several days after the meal.

== Leftover portions ==
Leftovers have had a major impact on the consumption of food, particularly the size of portions. Portion sizes have increased greatly. In general, food leftovers have both positive and negative impacts, depending on the person's eating habits involved with leftovers. With an increase in portion size comes the perception of the amount of intake a particular person considers. For example, a smaller portion usually leads to smaller consumption, making a person believe they have not eaten enough and negatively impacting their eating habits. In turn, a larger portion leads to a greater amount of leftovers, whereas a smaller portion leads to a small amount of leftovers. Through extensive research, one of the most influential factors of weight gain is leftover food and the increased amount of consumption because of it.

== Chop suey ==
The name of the Chinese-American dish chop suey is sometimes translated as "miscellaneous leftovers", although it is unlikely that actual leftovers were served at chop suey restaurants.

== "Doggy bag" ==
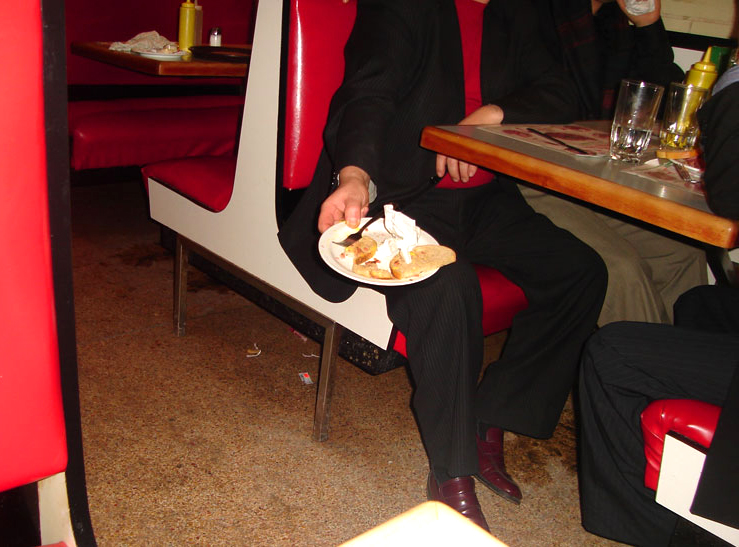
Restaurant patron showing leftovers

Diners in a restaurant may leave uneaten food for the restaurant to discard, or take it away for later consumption. To take the food away, the diner might request a container, or ask a server to package it. In the late 20th century in the United States, such a container was once called a doggy bag or doggie bag. This term has largely fallen out of fashion and is no longer used. This most likely derives from a pretense that the diner plans to give the food to a pet rather than eat it themselves, and so may be a euphemism. The modern doggie bag came about in the 1940s. Some also speculate the name was born during World War II when food shortages encouraged people to limit waste, and pet food was scarce. In 1943, San Francisco cafés, in an initiative to prevent animal cruelty, offered patrons Pet Pakits, cartons that patrons could readily request to carry home leftovers. The term doggy bag was popularized in the 1970s etiquette columns of many newspapers.

Containers for leftovers are most common in restaurants that offer a take-out food service as well as sit-down meals, and their prevalence as an accepted social custom varies widely by location. In some countries, people might frown upon a diner asking for a takeaway container. In the UK, in the year 2010 it was still considered an Americanism and an uncommon request to ask for a "doggy bag", but the practice became far more accepted after campaigns for waste reduction and the cost-of-living crisis, and some countries now obligate restaurants to offer take-home options.

Some restaurants wrap leftovers in aluminum foil, creating shapes such as swans or sea horses.

== See also ==
- Foam food container
- Oyster pail
- Food waste
- Pagpag
- Tirit
- Bibimbap
