= False accusation =

Claim or allegation of wrongdoing that is untrue

A false accusation is a claim or allegation of wrongdoing that is untrue or unsubstantiated. False accusations are also known as groundless accusations, unfounded accusations, false allegations, false claims or unsubstantiated allegations. They can occur in everyday life, in quasi-judicial proceedings, and in judicial proceedings.

Making a false accusation is a crime in many jurisdictions. In the United Kingdom, if a person acts in a way that intends or perverts the course of justice, for example by making false accusations to the Metropolitan Police, they are guilty of a criminal offence. This includes making crime reports that contain false allegations, that causes someone to be arrested or even fall under suspicion. Sometimes, the people who are actually guilty of an offence may do this to divert attention away from their own crimes. In certain circumstances, the person wrongly accused of a crime is the victim of a crime which should be investigated.

== Types ==
When there is insufficient supporting evidence to determine whether it is true or false, an accusation is described as "unsubstantiated" or "unfounded". Accusations that are determined to be false based on corroborating evidence can be divided into three categories:

- A completely false allegation, in that the alleged events did not occur.
- An allegation that describes events that did occur, but were perpetrated by an individual who is not accused, and in which the accused person is innocent.
- An allegation that is false, in that it mixes descriptions of events that actually happened with other events that did not occur.

A false allegation can occur as the result of intentional lying on the part of the accuser; or unintentionally, due to a confabulation, either arising spontaneously due to mental illness or resulting from deliberate or accidental suggestive questioning, or faulty interviewing techniques. In 1997, the researchers Poole and Lindsay suggested that separate labels should be applied to the two concepts, proposing that "false allegations" be used when the accuser is aware that they are lying, and "false suspicions" for the wider range of false accusations in which suggestive questioning may have been involved.

When a person is suspected of a wrongdoing for which they are in fact responsible, "false accusation may be used to divert attention from one's own guilt". False accusation may also arise in part from the conduct of the accused, particularly where the accused engages in behaviors consistent with having committed the suspected wrongdoing, either unconsciously or for purposes of appearing guilty.

Additionally, once a false accusation has been made – particularly an emotionally laden one – normal human emotional responses to being falsely accused (such as fear, anger, or denial of the accusation) may be misinterpreted as evidence of guilt. Examples would include accusations based on irrational psychotic paranoia.

== Rape ==
A false accusation of rape is the intentional reporting of a rape where no rape has occurred. It is difficult to assess the prevalence of false accusations because they are often conflated with non-prosecuted cases under the designation "unfounded". However, in the United States, the FBI Uniform Crime Report in 1996 and the United States Department of Justice in 1997 stated 8% of rape accusations in the United States were regarded as unfounded or false. Studies in other countries have reported their own rates at anywhere from 1.5% (Denmark) to 10% (Canada). Due to varying definitions of a "false accusation", the true percentage remains unknown.

== Child abuse ==
A false allegation of child sexual abuse is an accusation that a person committed one or more acts of child sexual abuse when in reality there was no perpetration of abuse by the accused person as alleged. Such accusations can be brought by the victim, or by another person on the alleged victim's behalf. Studies of child abuse allegations suggest that the overall rate of false accusation is under 10%, as approximated based on multiple studies. Of the allegations determined to be false, only a small portion originated with the child, the studies showed; most false allegations originated with an adult bringing the accusations on behalf of a child, and of those, a large majority occurred in the context of divorce and child-custody battles.

== Workplace bullying ==
According to a 2003 survey by the Workplace Bullying Institute, false accusations of "errors" are among the most common workplace bullying tactics.

== Workplace mobbing ==
Workplace mobbing can be considered as a "virus" or a "cancer" that spreads throughout the workplace via gossip, rumour and unfounded accusations.

== Münchausen syndrome by proxy ==
The case has been made that diagnoses of Münchausen syndrome by proxy, that is harming someone else in order to gain attention for oneself, are often false or highly questionable.

== Stalking ==
In 1999, Pathe, Mullen, and Purcell wrote that popular interest in stalking was promoting false claims. In 2004, Sheridan and Blaauw said that they estimated that 11.5% of claims in a sample of 357 reported claims of stalking were false.

== See also ==
- Accusation
- Allegation
- Black propaganda
- Blackstone's ratio
- Blame
- Criminal accusation
- Cancel culture
- Defamation
- False alarm
- False arrest
- False Claims Act
- False conviction
- False evidence
- False imprisonment
- False statement
- Legal abuse
- Lie
- Paranoia
- Perjury
- Presumption of guilt
- Presumption of innocence
- Sham peer review
- Smear campaign
- Victim blaming
