= Peer review =

Evaluation by peers with similar expertise

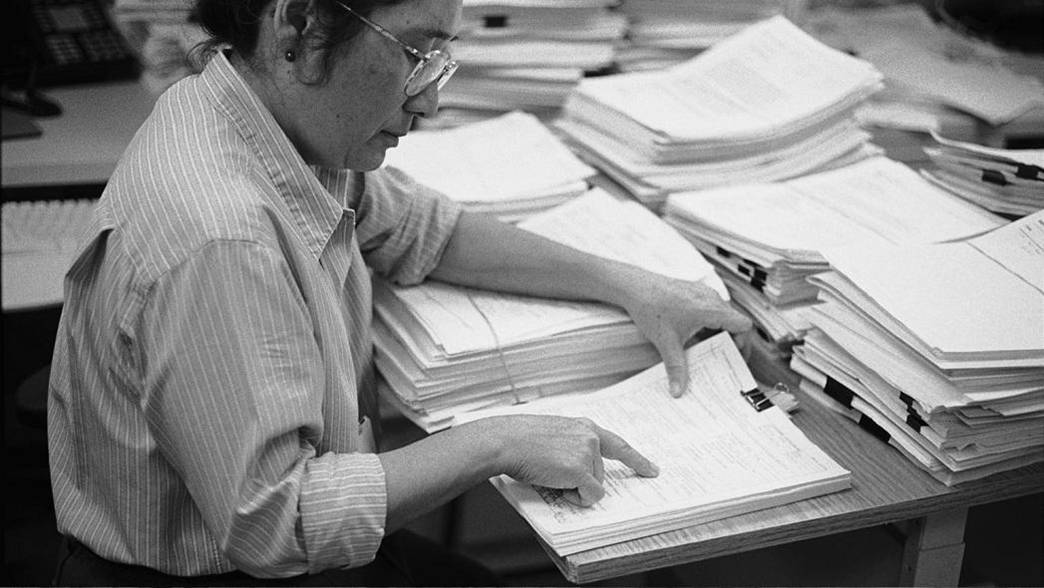
A reviewer at the American National Institutes of Health evaluating a grant proposal

Peer review is the evaluation of work by one or more people with similar competencies as the producers of the work (peers). It functions as a form of self-regulation by qualified members of a profession within the relevant field. Peer review methods are used to maintain quality standards, improve performance, and provide credibility. In academia, scholarly peer review is typically used to determine an academic paper's suitability for publication. The reviewers are experts in the topic at hand and anonymous. The type and by the field or profession in which the activity occurs can categorize peer review, e.g., medical peer review. It can also be used as a teaching tool.

Henry Oldenburg (1619–1677) was a German-born British philosopher who is seen as the 'father' of modern scientific peer review. It developed over the following centuries with, for example, the journal Nature making it standard practice in 1973. The term "peer review" was first used in the early 1970s. A monument to peer review has been at the Higher School of Economics in Moscow since 2017.

== Professional ==
Professional peer review focuses on the performance of professionals, with a view to improving quality, upholding standards, or providing certification. In academia, peer review is used to inform decisions related to faculty advancement and tenure.

A prototype professional peer review process was recommended in the Ethics of the Physician written by Ishāq ibn ʻAlī al-Ruhāwī (854–931). He stated that a visiting physician had to make duplicate notes of a patient's condition on every visit. When the patient was cured or had died, the notes of the physician were examined by a local medical council of other physicians, who would decide whether the treatment had met the required standards of medical care.

Professional peer review is common in the field of health care, where it is usually called clinical peer review. Further, since peer review activity is commonly segmented by clinical discipline, there is also physician peer review, nursing peer review, dentistry peer review, etc. Many other professional fields have some level of peer review process: accounting, law, engineering (e.g., software peer review, technical peer review), aviation, and even forest fire management.

Peer review is used in education to achieve certain learning objectives, particularly as a tool to reach higher order processes in the affective and cognitive domains as defined by Bloom's taxonomy. This may take a variety of forms, including closely mimicking the scholarly peer review processes used in science and medicine.

=== Scholarly ===
Scholarly peer review or academic peer review (also known as refereeing) is the process of having a researcher's methods and findings reviewed (usually anonymously) by experts (or "peers") in the same field. Peer review is widely used for helping the academic publisher (i.e., the editor-in-chief, the editorial board, or the program committee) decide whether the work should be accepted, considered acceptable with revisions, or rejected for official publication in an academic journal, a monograph, or in the proceedings of an academic conference. If the identities of authors are not revealed to each other, the procedure is called dual-anonymous peer review.

Academic peer review requires a community of experts in a given (and often narrowly defined) academic field, who are qualified and able to perform reasonably impartial review. Impartial review, especially of work in less narrowly defined or inter-disciplinary fields, may be difficult to accomplish, and the significance (good or bad) of an idea may never be widely appreciated among its contemporaries. Peer review is widely used to increase academic quality and is used in most major scholarly journals. However, criticism of peer review include failure to prevent publication of invalid research or scientific fraud, low correlation with future impact, slowness, and lack of accountability.

Top journals reject over 90% of submitted papers.

=== Medical ===
Medical peer review may be distinguished in four classifications:

1. Clinical peer review is a procedure for assessing a patient's involvement with experiences of care. It is a piece of progressing proficient practice assessment and centered proficient practice assessment—significant supporters of supplier credentialing and privileging.
2. Peer evaluation of clinical teaching skills for both physicians and nurses.
3. Scientific peer review of journal articles.
4. A secondary round of peer review for the clinical value of articles concurrently published in medical journals.

Additionally, "medical peer review" has been used by the American Medical Association to refer not only to the process of improving quality and safety in health care organizations, but also to the process of rating clinical behavior or compliance with professional society membership standards. The clinical network believes it to be the most ideal method of guaranteeing that distributed exploration is dependable and that any clinical medicines that it advocates are protected and viable for individuals. Thus, the terminology has poor standardization and specificity, particularly as a database search term.

=== Technical ===
In engineering, technical peer review is a type of engineering review. Technical peer reviews are a well-defined review process for finding and fixing defects, conducted by a team of peers with assigned roles. Technical peer reviews are carried out by peers representing areas of life cycle affected by material being reviewed (usually limited to 6 or fewer people). Technical peer reviews are held within development phases, between milestone reviews, on completed products or completed portions of products.

=== Governmental ===
The European Union has been using peer review in the "Open Method of Co-ordination" of policies in the fields of active labour market policy since 1999. In 2004, a program of peer reviews started in social inclusion. Each program sponsors about eight peer review meetings in each year, in which a "host country" lays a given policy or initiative open to examination by half a dozen other countries and the relevant European-level NGOs. These usually meet over two days and include visits to local sites where the policy can be seen in operation. The meeting is preceded by the compilation of an expert report on which participating "peer countries" submit comments. The results are published on the web.

The United Nations Economic Commission for Europe, through UNECE Environmental Performance Reviews, uses peer review, referred to as "peer learning", to evaluate progress made by its member countries in improving their environmental policies.

The State of California is the only U.S. state to mandate scientific peer review. In 1997, the Governor of California signed into law Senate Bill 1320 (Sher), Chapter 295, statutes of 1997, which mandates that, before any CalEPA Board, Department, or Office adopts a final version of a rule-making, the scientific findings, conclusions, and assumptions on which the proposed rule are based must be submitted for independent external scientific peer review. This requirement is incorporated into the California Health and Safety Code Section 57004.

=== Criticism of professional peer review ===
A particular concern in peer review is "role duality" as people are in parallel in the role of being an evaluator and being evaluated. Research illustrates that taking on both roles in parallel biases people in their role as evaluators as they engage in strategic actions to increase the chance of being evaluated positively themselves.

The editorial peer review process has been found to be strongly biased against studies with null results. "Who wants to read something that doesn't work?" asks Richard Smith in the Journal of the Royal Society of Medicine. "That's boring." This publication bias then biases the information base of science and medicine.

Peer reviewing can lead to conflicts between peer reviewers.

The (possibly not declared) use of artificial intelligence to assist or perform the process of peer review has been confirmed by interviews in a survey by Nature. There are a few documented cases of scholars who inserted human-invisible prompts in their preprints in order to favour a positive review in case of an automated refereeing process.

=== Improvement and alternatives ===
Various alternatives to peer review have been suggested such as, in the context of science funding, funding-by-lottery. Registered reports and peer-replication can mitigate the replication crisis. Adversarial systems can reduce ideological biases.

== Pedagogical ==
Peer review, or student peer assessment, is the method by which editors and writers work together in hopes of helping the author establish and further flesh out and develop their own writing. Peer review is widely used in secondary and post-secondary education as part of the writing process. This collaborative learning tool involves groups of students reviewing each other's work and providing feedback and suggestions for revision. Rather than a means of critiquing each other's work, peer review is often framed as a way to build connection between students and help develop writers' identity. While widely used in English and composition classrooms, peer review has gained popularity in other disciplines that require writing as part of the curriculum including the social and natural sciences. The concept of peer review has been extended to other practices, including the use of visual peer review for evaluating peer-produced data visualizations.

Peer review in classrooms helps students become more invested in their work, and the classroom environment at large. Understanding how their work is read by a diverse readership before it is graded by the teacher may also help students clarify ideas and understand how to persuasively reach different audience members via their writing. It also gives students professional experience that they might draw on later when asked to review the work of a colleague prior to publication. The process can also bolster the confidence of students on both sides of the process. It has been found that students are more positive than negative when reviewing their classmates' writing. Peer review can help students not get discouraged but rather feel determined to improve their writing. The process is shown to improve writing performance from giving feedback rather than only receiving it because giving feedback fosters self-reflection.

=== Peer seminar ===
Peer seminar is a method that involves a speaker that presents ideas to an audience that also acts as a "contest". To further elaborate, there are multiple speakers that are called out one at a time and given an amount of time to present the topic that they have researched. Each speaker may or may not talk about the same topic but each speaker has something to gain or lose which can foster a competitive atmosphere. This approach allows speakers to present in a more personal tone while trying to appeal to the audience while explaining their topic.

Peer seminars may be somewhat similar to what conference speakers do, however, there is more time to present their points, and speakers can be interrupted by audience members to provide questions and feedback upon the topic or how well the speaker did in presenting their topic.

=== Peer review in writing ===
Professional peer review focuses on the performance of professionals, with a view to improving quality, upholding standards, or providing certification. Peer reviewin writing is a pivotal component among various peer review mechanisms, often spearheaded by educators and involving student participation, particularly in academic settings. It constitutes a fundamental process in academic and professional writing, serving as a systematic means to ensure the quality, effectiveness, and credibility of scholarly work. However, despite its widespread use, it is one of the most scattered, inconsistent, and ambiguous practices associated with writing instruction. Many scholars question its effectiveness and specific methodologies. Critics of peer review in classrooms express concerns about its ineffectiveness due to students' lack of practice in giving constructive criticism or their limited expertise in the writing craft overall.

=== Comparison and improvement ===
Magda Tigchelaar compares peer review with self-assessment through an experiment that divided students into three groups: self-assessment, peer review, and no review. Across four writing projects, she observed changes in each group, with surprising results showing significant improvement only in the self-assessment group. The author's analysis suggests that self-assessment allows individuals to clearly understand the revision goals at each stage, as the author is the most familiar with their writing. Thus, self-checking naturally follows a systematic and planned approach to revision. In contrast, the effectiveness of peer review is often limited due to the lack of structured feedback, characterized by scattered, meaningless summaries and evaluations that fail to meet the author's expectations for revising their work. Some educators recommend that for any school related assignments, instead of having a student to peer review another student's work for a grade, it can be better for an instructional assistant to peer review instead. Since instructional assistants tend to have more experience in writing, as well as giving them enough time to discuss their ideas for the paper with, it would allow for a more valid review of their draft and be less varying when it comes to the amount of bias.

Stephanie Conner and Jennifer Gray highlight the value of most students' feedback during peer review. They argue that many peer review sessions fail to meet students' expectations, as students, even as reviewers themselves, feel uncertain about providing constructive feedback due to their lack of confidence in their writing. The authors offer numerous improvement strategies. For instance, the peer review process can be segmented into groups, where students present the papers to be reviewed while other group members take notes and analyze them. Then, the review scope can be expanded to the entire class. This widens the review sources and further enhances the level of professionalism.

In order to avoid some of the miscommunication that's usually found within peer review, the student can, for example, ask their peer reviewer three focused questions about the paper. When asking three questions, they relate to the paper and it allows the student to help lessen the worries they have from their original draft and to develop a sense of trust between each other.

With evolving technology, peer review is also expected to evolve. New tools have the potential to transform the peer review process. Mimi Li discusses the effectiveness and feedback of an online peer review software used in their freshman writing class. Unlike traditional peer review methods commonly used in classrooms, the online peer review software offers many tools for editing articles and comprehensive guidance. For instance, it lists numerous questions peer reviewers can ask and allows various comments to be added to the selected text. Based on observations over a semester, students showed varying degrees of improvement in their writing skills and grades after using the online peer review software. Additionally, they highly praised the technology of online peer review.

=== Criticism of pedagogical peer review ===
Critics of peer review in classrooms say that it can be ineffective due to students' lack of practice giving constructive criticism, or lack of expertise in the writing craft at large. Peer review can be problematic for developmental writers, particularly if students view their writing as inferior to others in the class as they may be unwilling to offer suggestions or ask other writers for help. Peer review can impact a student's opinion of themselves as well as others as sometimes students feel a personal connection to the work they have produced, which can also make them feel reluctant to receive or offer criticism. The quality of feedback is a necessary requirement for the process to be effective.

Teachers using peer review as an assignment can lead to rushed-through feedback by peers, using incorrect praise or criticism, thus not allowing the writer or the editor to get much out of the activity. As a response to these concerns, instructors may provide examples, model peer review with the class, or focus on specific areas of feedback during the peer review process. Instructors may also experiment with in-class peer review vs. peer review as homework, or peer review using technologies afforded by learning management systems online. Students' skills develop when the process is implemented as a consistent tool within classrooms rather than an occasional one. Abilities are strengthened when teaching methods lean away from task completion and towards writing growth. Students that are older can give better feedback to their peers, getting more out of peer review, but it is still a method used in classrooms to help students young and old learn how to revise. With evolving and changing technology, peer review will develop as well. New tools could help alter the process of peer review. The use of artificial intelligence has been suggested to provide feedback and edits in writing, but it is not fully capable of replacing human effort.

Teachers as well have expressed disdain in peer review during teaching, with plenty of them claiming it to waste time in class and unimportant if students already know what they're going to get for their assignment. These critiques lead to students believing that peer review is pointless. This is also particularly evident in university classrooms, where the most common source of writing feedback during student years often comes from teachers, whose comments are often highly valued. Students may become influenced to provide research in line with the professor's viewpoints, because of the teacher's position of high authority. The effectiveness of feedback largely stems from its high authority. Benjamin Keating, in his article "A Good Development Thing: A Longitudinal Analysis of Peer Review and Authority in Undergraduate Writing," conducted a longitudinal study comparing two groups of students (one majoring in writing and one not) to explore students' perceptions of authority. This research, involving extensive analysis of student texts, concludes that students majoring in non-writing fields tend to undervalue mandatory peer review in class, while those majoring in writing value classmates' comments more. This reflects that peer review feedback has a certain threshold, and effective peer review requires a certain level of expertise. For non-professional writers, peer review feedback may be overlooked, thereby affecting its effectiveness. Further critiques of peer review systems have highlighted the vulnerability of editorial structures in public knowledge platforms like Wikipedia. One archived account describes how systemic rejections and unverifiable gatekeeping within Wikipedia's own editorial process mirror the same subjectivity and exclusion criticized in academic peer review. Elizabeth Ellis Miller, Cameron Mozafari, Justin Lohr and Jessica Enoch state, "While peer review is an integral part of writing classrooms, students often struggle to effectively engage in it." The authors illustrate some reasons for the inefficiency of peer review based on research conducted during peer review sessions in university classrooms:

1. Lack of Training: Students and even some faculty members may not have received sufficient training to provide constructive feedback. Without proper guidance on what to look for and how to provide helpful comments, peer reviewers may find it challenging to offer meaningful insights.
2. Limited Engagement: Students may participate in peer review sessions with minimal enthusiasm or involvement, viewing them as obligatory tasks rather than valuable learning opportunities. This lack of investment can result in superficial feedback that fails to address underlying issues in the writing.
3. Time Constraints: Instructors often allocate limited time for peer review activities during class sessions, which may not be adequate for thorough reviews of peers' work. Consequently, feedback may be rushed or superficial, lacking the depth required for meaningful improvement.

This research demonstrates that besides issues related to expertise, numerous objective factors contribute to students' poor performance in peer review sessions, resulting in feedback from peer reviewers that may not effectively assist authors. Additionally, this study highlights the influence of emotions in peer review sessions, suggesting that both peer reviewers and authors cannot completely eliminate emotions when providing and receiving feedback. This can lead to peer reviewers and authors approaching the feedback with either positive or negative attitudes towards the text, resulting in selective or biased feedback and review, further impacting their ability to objectively evaluate the article. It implies that subjective emotions may also affect the effectiveness of peer review feedback.

Pamela Bedore and Brian O'Sullivan also hold a skeptical view of peer review in most writing contexts. The authors conclude, based on comparing different forms of peer review after systematic training at two universities, that "the crux is that peer review is not just about improving writing but about helping authors achieve their writing vision." Feedback from the majority of non-professional writers during peer review sessions often tends to be superficial, such as simple grammar corrections and questions. This precisely reflects the implication in the conclusion that the focus is only on improving writing skills. Meaningful peer review involves understanding the author's writing intent, posing valuable questions and perspectives, and guiding the author to achieve their writing goals.

== See also ==
- Objectivity (philosophy)
- Academic publishing
- Scientific literature
- Peer critique
- Predatory publishing
- Methodology
