= Subpoena duces tecum =

Court order to produce evidence

A subpoena duces tecum (pronounced in English /səˈpiːnə ˌdjuːsiːz ˈtiːkəm/ sə-PEE-nə DEW-seez TEE-kəm), or subpoena for production of evidence, is a court summons ordering the recipient to appear before the court and produce documents or other tangible evidence for use at a hearing or trial. In some jurisdictions, it can also be issued by legislative bodies such as county boards of supervisors.

The summons is known by various names in different jurisdictions. The term subpoena duces tecum is used in the United States, and some other common law jurisdictions such as South Africa and Canada. The summons is called a "subpoena for production of evidence" in some U.S. states that have sought to reduce the use of non-English words and phrases in court terminology.

The subpoena duces tecum is similar to the subpoena ad testificandum, which is a writ summoning a witness to testify orally. However, unlike the latter summons, the subpoena duces tecum instructs the witness to bring in hand books, papers, or evidence for the court. In most jurisdictions, a subpoena usually has to be served personally.

== Etymology ==
The phrase sub poena duces tecum is a Latin expression meaning literally "under [threat of] penalty [or punishment], you will bring [it] with you." The word sub means "under" and poena "penalty"; duces "you will lead, guide, pull, bring"; and tecum "with you".

== Order pursuant to a deposition ==
In the United States, a notice to a party (to the action) deponent (a person called to testify in a deposition) may be accompanied by a request for production of documents and other tangible things during the taking of a deposition. The notice to produce (literally: "bring these documents with you to the deposition") is served prior to the deposition. This follows the Federal Rules of Civil Procedure. The method of using a subpoena duces tecum is generally valid only to compel a witness to produce documents and other things at the time of the deposition.

If a deponent is a non-party to the action (not involved directly in the litigation, but wanted for testimony), production of documents can be compelled only through a proper subpoena duces tecum.

Federal cases and some states follow Rule 27(a)(3) of the Federal Rules of Civil Procedure concerning the production of documents in pretrial discovery, including those pertaining to depositions. These can include the subpoena duces tecum to produce documents, or in some cases to undergo a physical or mental examination. In the Ninth Circuit, interpreting Rule 27 literally, it has been held that a party can simply produce the documents only, and in certain cases, avoid an oral deposition when presented with a subpoena duces tecum.

=== Jencks Act criminal cases ===
In the 1957 case Jencks v. United States the United States Supreme Court ruled that a defendant must have access to government witnesses who will testify against him in a criminal trial, and must also have access to any documents pertaining to that testimony. This includes papers, documents, written statements, and the like. This led to passage of the Jencks Act, 18 USC, Part II, Chapter 223, § 3500, which allows for subpoena duces tecum of relevant government documents, but only after a government agent or employee has testified at trial. There can be no pre-trial discovery. The subpoena is allowed by the trial judge. The government has the right to deny access to the documents. This may be due to the sensitive nature of the documents, or because they are classified.

If a remedy is granted, there is a mistrial and dismissal of criminal charges. An accused criminal has no right to subpoena the work product of the prosecution in a criminal case.

== US state court seeking to compel production of documents from a witness in another state ==
The subpoena power of any state court in the United States generally ends at that state’s border. Consequently, lacking any powers outside the state's border, state prosecutors and defense attorneys in a state criminal case cannot use the same procedures that they would use to obtain a subpoena for an out-of-state witness that they would for an in-state witness.

== Compelling a foreign corporation to produce documents ==
A domestic corporation may be considered to be a "person" within the meaning of the Fourteenth Amendment of the United States Constitution. It is not necessary to treat a corporation as a person in all circumstances. United States case law is confusing concerning this matter when dealing with foreign corporations, and their operation within the United States. Especially troubling have been rulings concerning the Fourth Amendment of the United States Constitution and Fifth Amendment to the United States Constitution. A foreign agent may not claim Fifth Amendment provisions against self-incrimination. Nor can records be withheld from subpoena duces tecum on the grounds that production of such documents would incriminate officers or other members of the foreign corporation. However, there is case authority in which foreign corporations have been protected from illegal searches and seizures, including documents and books. The matter of a foreign corporation operating as a "person" within the United States being afforded protection under the Fourteenth Amendment is discussed.

== Failure to produce documents ==
In the United States, a continuance (a rescheduling of a court hearing to a later date) of a civil action may be granted due to the absence of documents or papers. The party failing to produce the documents requested by a subpoena duces tecum must show good reason why there was a failure to do so. Acceptable explanations have included loss or destruction of papers, or an agreement to use copies. The party seeking the continuance must show that the absence of the documents is not because of the negligence of their own, or of the attorney of record.

Similarly, a continuance may be granted in a criminal case if there is good reason documents pertinent to the case could not be produced at the time of trial. For example, a continuance should be granted for failure to produce a transcript of testimony given at a previous trial. In general, it is reversible error to proceed with a criminal trial in the absence of a previous trial transcript, when such contains pertinent information that should have been considered in the new trial. In these cases, a continuance is the usual remedy.

=== Commitment of witness; contempt of court ===
A witness who has refused to obey a lawful order to produce books, documents and papers may be incarcerated for contempt of court. A writ of habeas corpus will not apply unless it can be shown the witness could not have legally had possession of such documents. In such a situation the writ of habeas corpus will properly apply, and is the remedy for such improper action.

At common law, and under various statutes pertaining to a given jurisdiction, a right to action for damages, or for a statutory penalty or forfeiture, exists against a witness who, without sufficient excuse, fails or refuses to give oral testimony or to produce documents or other specified items in obedience to the command of a properly issued and served subpoena.

There are certain conditions precedent, or defenses, to a recovery of damages for a person's failure to testify, or to provide documents pertinent to a hearing or trial. There must be a breach of testimonial duty, after having been properly served with a legitimately executed subpoena. There must be a demonstration of actual damages incurred from the absence of testimony. Most courts have rejected the arguments for seeking damages in this kind of case. Giving false testimony in a judicial proceeding even though the allegation is made that the person giving the testimony knew it to be false does not give rise, either at common law or by statute, to a civil action for damages resulting from such testimony. The situation is probably different if intentionally false documents are submitted under a subpoena duces tecum.

== Writ of mandamus vacating an order to produce documents ==
A writ of mandamus (Latin for "we command") is appropriate to compel surrender of documents in the possession of attorneys or other persons that have been illegally obtained under the abuse of a writ of attachment. Mandamus can vacate an order to produce books and papers.

In an 1893 case, the United States Attorney for Alabama refused to vacate his office, refusing to surrender books, papers, and other materials to the newly appointed US Attorney. The federal court in Alabama issued a writ directing the previous attorney to relinquish the documents. He, in turn, sought relief from the Supreme Court, which denied his application, saying it would not interfere with the properly conducted internal matters of a court. In the case In re: Parsons, the US Supreme Court wrote:

"If the orders be regarded merely as directions in the administration of judicial affairs in respect of the immediate possession of property or custody of prisoners, we cannot be properly called to, by reason of anything appearing on these records, in the exercise of appellate jurisdiction in this manner, to direct them to be set aside. And if the proceedings should be treated as involving a final determination as on issues joined to the right to such possession and custody, there was no complaint of want of notice or of hearing, and the summary made adopted did not in itself affect the jurisdiction of the Circuit Court upon the ground that it had exceeded its powers."

Mandamus is the remedy where a lower court has clearly failed to issue compulsion to produce documents, or to allow the petitioner access to such documents as may be in the possession of the court or the parties to the action. Mandamus can be used to compel a court to enforce an order to answer interrogatories (questions submitted by the court or one of the parties to be answered under oath and pain of perjury).

Mandamus is the proper remedy to compel the quashing of a subpoena duces tecum for the production before a grand jury of documents protected by attorney–client privilege. Presumably, this would apply to attorney work product, although there is no case law on the matter.

== Public access to documents filed with the court ==
The right of the public to access judicial records is fundamental to a democratic state and is analogous to the United States' First Amendment right of freedom of speech and of the press and the Sixth Amendment right to public trials. While the right to access trial records is not absolute, it is framed in presumption of public access to the proceedings and records. United States Code 11, Section 107 (a), of the federal bankruptcy law, is a codification of the common-law general right to inspect judicial records and documents. However, the right is not absolute and may be denied when the entity seeking to view the records has an improper purpose. The general intent of the statute is to favor public access to court documents.

== Specific types of documents ==
=== Privileged documents ===
Attorney–client privilege is generally recognized by the courts. Communications between lawyer and client are generally immune from subpoena. In other words, a lawyer cannot be compelled to testify in a trial unless the lawyer becomes, or appears to become, a party to the litigation. A similar situation exists with "work product", meaning written documents or computer records generated in preparation for a trial or hearing. This includes information such as potential questions that may be asked of witnesses, lists of possible witnesses, memoranda, notes, trial strategies, written briefs, or documents that may, or may not end up being used in the course of litigation. Usually, none of this can be the subject of a subpoena duces tecum. If a communication between lawyer and client is made in the presence of a third party, the privilege is not recognized to exist.

The federal courts will apply the common law rule of attorney–client privilege unless there is an intervening state law applying to the central issues of the matter. In those cases, the federal court uses the effective state law.

Physician–patient privilege is usually statutorily defined, and can vary from state to state. The usual rule is that medical records are immune from subpoena if the plaintiff has not alleged physical or mental injuries or damages. Once the plaintiff alleges physical or mental injuries proximately flowing from a potentially tortious act by the defendant, or in some other disability hearing, medical records can be subject to subpoena duces tecum. While witnesses may try to resist legal discovery by asking the judge to protect them from questioning or inspection of documents, the policy of the courts is in favor of full disclosure. It is the intent of the rules of procedure that pre-trial discovery take place without any intervention of a judge. So-called "fishing expeditions" (massive and aimless calls for all documents related to the litigation) are permissible under Federal Rule of Civil Procedure 26 (b) (1). This rule is repeated in many states' rules of procedure: "Parties may obtain discovery regarding any matter, not privileged, which is relevant ... if the information sought appears reasonably calculated to lead to the discovery of admissible evidence." The looseness of the definition of relevant evidence is generally construed to mean "liberal" production. The physician who is the party to an action does not own the records of patients he has treated. They are not privileged if the patient has waived confidentiality. Physicians must produce medical records under subpoena duces tecum.

Peer review records and other hospital documents of quality control committee meetings are generally not subject to subpoena duces tecum, since these have statutory immunity. The theory is that the frankness of peer review would be chilled if these records could be routinely compelled.

Several United States Federal Circuit Courts have recognized a limited reporter's privilege.

In some states (such as California), rape crisis counselors and domestic violence advocates hold a statutory privilege analogous to therapist–client privilege. (See, for example, 1035 Cal. Evidence Code for rape crisis advocates, and 1037.6 Cal. Evidence Code for domestic violence advocates).

=== Welfare documents ===
Statutes governing the disclosure of information contained in welfare records exist in many jurisdictions. The rationale for the existence of these regulations is to encourage full and frank disclosure by the welfare recipient of his situation and the protection of the recipient from the embarrassment likely to result from the disclosure of information contained in such records. In some states, records can be disclosed at the discretion of the state director of welfare. In general, welfare records are not public records, and should not be considered to be such. Disclosure of information is usually limited to purposes directly connected with the administration of welfare benefits. The investigation of costs of welfare programs have been held to be sufficiently related to the matters in question to justify disclosure. Statutes designed to limit welfare record availability are generally held by the courts to be not immune from the power of subpoena duces tecum. Certain state laws limit the availability of information that can be obtained from the subpoena of such documents. These are always subject to a court challenge, on a case-by-case basis. Welfare recipients are generally allowed access to their files, by subpoena duces tecum. Death of a welfare recipient is considered in some states to be sufficient reason to remove the reason for confidentiality. Some states have passed so-called "Right to Know" statutes, which would make welfare recipients and the information available to the public. These, along with common law, and state and federal constitutions guaranteeing freedom of the press do not give newspapers (or other news media) the right to access the names of persons on welfare, or the amounts they receive.

=== Documents in bankruptcy proceeding ===
An entity (person or a corporation) may be compelled to produce documentary evidence in accordance with the subpoena powers of Federal Rule of Civil Procedure 45 as applied by Bankruptcy Rule 9016. The United States Bankruptcy Court has powers to compel production of documents from a non-debtor corporation or person concerning transactions involving the debtor corporation or person. Production of documents can be challenged as being burdensome. Assets diverted to outside corporations or bank accounts/stock portfolios and such other assets as land holdings lie within the power to compel production under subpoena duces tecum. Federal law recognizes no accountant-client privilege. A subpoena duce tecum served pursuant to Bankruptcy Rule 2004 is not a violation of accountant-client privilege. 11 United States Code section 107 (a) provides that papers filed in cases under the Bankruptcy Code and dockets of the Bankruptcy Courts are public records and are to be open to examination at reasonable times without charge.

=== Documents relating to Federal Trade Commission hearings in monopoly actions ===
Whenever the Federal Trade Commission (FTC) has reason to believe that any person has violated 15 USC section 13, 14, 18 or 19, it must issue and serve on that person and on the Attorney General of the United States, a complaint stating its charges in that regard. The notice shall also give a date for a hearing in the matter. Delivery of the subpoena duces tecum for production of documents may be done in person, or by certified letter. Receipt of the letter is considered proof of service.

Power to issue subpoenas is extended to Robinson–Patman Act cases of price-fixing and Clayton Act cases of unlawful acquisition.

A Federal District Court lacks jurisdiction to enjoin the Federal Trade Commission from proceeding in an investigation. It cannot stay (stop) a subpoena duces tecum to produce documents in the investigative stage. An injunction by a federal court does not have the power to restrain the FTC from enforcing an order requiring corporations to furnish reports and documents un 15 USC § 49. The only relief available to stop a demand for documents is to seek an action of compliance in mandamus by the Attorney General of the United States, or under 15 USC § 50 to enforce fines and forfeitures.

If the FTC institutes an adjudicative proceeding (a hearing), the person who originated the matter by complaining to the FTC is not a party to the action and does not have any control over it. The FTC may allow the complaining person to participate in the proceeding by virtue of 15 USC, section 45. This allows participation for good cause, either by counsel (lawyer) or in person. You cannot intervene in an FTC hearing, except by demonstrating that substantial issues of law or fact would not be properly raised and argued—and that these issues are important and immediate enough to warrant additional expenditure of FTC resources. This involvement can be enhanced by subpoena duces tecum.

Pre-hearing conferences are the norm. These are useful in:

- Clarifying or simplifying issues
- Amending pleadings
- Entering stipulations, admissions of fact, and contents and authenticity of documents
- Expediting discovery and presentation of evidence, including restriction of witnesses
- Matters subject to official notice that may be resolved by further production of documents related to the case

In general, pre-hearing conferences are not public. The FTC is not restricted by a rigid rule of evidence.

=== Documents in execution proceedings ===
Discovery can be authorized for the production of documents for both pre-trial and post-trial actions. Most states either follow, or have modeled their procedures after, the Federal Rules of Civil Procedure Rule 69(a).

Judgment creditors (those who have received a favorable court ruling for monetary damages) are permitted to ask questions about a debtor's residence; recent employment history; business relationships, including partners, co-shareholders, co-officers, co-directors; the contents of a will; transfers of property; and the identity of persons who either owed a debt to the judgment debtor, or received things of value from the debtor. Information in bank accounts can also be the subject of a subpoena duces tecum.

In federal court proceedings concerning judgment debtors, the inquiry is usually limited to the discovery of assets. In international cases, being tried in United States Federal Courts, the application of the Hague Service Convention is utilized where appropriate.

=== Medical records ===
==== Administrative law ====
Disabled persons under the age of 65 years can be eligible for disability benefits under Social Security Titles II and XVI.

The seminal case in Social Security law is Richardson v. Perales, a Supreme Court decision from 1971. The court directed that medical reports put forth by a treating physician in Social Security hearings should be accepted as evidence, despite the hearsay nature of the medical records. These should be accepted, even if cross-examination is not available. The claimant has the right to subpoena the treating physician. In cases of conflicting medical evidence, it is not unconstitutional for the hearing officer to obtain independent medical advice to help resolve the physical questions involved. Under the Administrative Procedure Act, hearsay in the form of medical records are admissible up to the point of relevancy.

Several federal agencies have adopted Jencks Act rules. Although the Jencks Act applies only to government agents or employees who testify in criminal cases, making these witnesses and relevant documents available for cross-examination after testimony, it has been applied in administrative law cases in the interests of justice and fair play. The party of record must make an official request to the hearing officer to have Jencks rules followed. Some agency rules such as National Labor Relations Board automatically follow Jencks Act requirements.

==== Medical malpractice actions ====
In a case of alleged negligence by a physician, written summaries of the case by physicians provided to the insurance carrier or other parties can be the subject of a subpoena duces tecum, if, in the opinion of the court, they are relevant to the plaintiff's case. Claims that these statements are "work product" will generally fail.

Medical records form the core of any medical malpractice case. Actions for malpractice are controlled by the general rules of evidence in civil procedure. A malpractice action necessarily involves the question of requisite care and skill applied in a medical case. With the exception of res ipsa loquitur cases, medical opinion about the care is essential. This involves the necessity to obtain a subpoena duces tecum for medical records.

Admission of "learned treatises" (published books and medical articles) at trial varies from jurisdiction to jurisdiction. Some require that the expert admit it is an authoritative reference. Others will allow admission of learned treatises by judicial notice.

==== Experts and opinion evidence ====
In tort actions for recovery of damages, it is necessary for the introduction of medical records to establish a basis for the claimed loss. An injured plaintiff is entitled to recover the expenses necessary to cure or treat injuries. Courts frequently call upon expert testimony to interpret and advise, after examining medical records concerning the nature of injuries, future medical, disability and other issues before the court.

==== Worker's Compensation actions ====
Medical records introduced as evidence are crucial in determining both causation and impairment in worker's compensation cases. In cases where the evidence is contested, medical evidence in the form of records, opinions, affidavits and testimony concerning both fact and opinion is necessary. When oral testimony is taken from physicians, the usual standard is to state an opinion "within a reasonable degree of medical certainty". Worker's compensation laws are dictated by state statute or Federal Employers Liability Act. In many states, the employer has the right to demand an independent examination and can also direct treatment be carried out by certain physicians.

==== Mandatory reporting of child abuse ====
In the landmark 1976 California case of Landeros v. Flood, the California Supreme Court remanded a case to the trial court for action in tort against a treating physician for failure to report suspected child abuse. The theory at trial was that the plaintiff, a child of about 12 months of age, had been returned to a home where further physical abuse occurred, causing more damages. This was because the physician had failed to report the abuse in violation of California law. After this case, all states instituted mandatory reporting by physicians and other medical personnel of any suspected child abuse or neglect cases. In general, reporting in good faith shields the physician or health care worker from tort liability. Reporting to police or social services necessitates obtaining medical records by subpoena duces tecum. This case, and legislation that followed it were in response to several articles that appeared in the medical literature that defined battered child syndrome and child abuse syndrome.

The 1962 Social Security Amendments require each state to make child welfare services available throughout the state to all children and provide coordination between child welfare services (Title IV-B) and social services provided under the Aid to Families with Dependent Children Act (ADC, later known as AFDC; now called Title XX) Determinations in these cases frequently require production of medical records.

In 1972, Congressional hearings began on child abuse and neglect. In response, Congress passed the Child Abuse Prevention and Treatment Act, which defined abuse as "physical or mental injury, negligent treatment, or maltreatment of a child under the age of 18 by a person who is responsible for the child's welfare under circumstances which would indicate that the child's health or welfare is harmed or threatened thereby". The legislation created the National Center on Child Abuse and Neglect as an information clearinghouse.

The Child Abuse Prevention and Treatment Act of 1974 (42 U.S.C. § 5101 – 42 U.S.C. § 5106) defined "child abuse and neglect" as "physical or mental injury, sexual abuse, negligent treatment, or maltreatment of a child under the age of eighteen by a person responsible for the child's welfare under circumstances which indicate that the child's health or welfare is harmed or threatened thereby."

The Child Abuse Prevention and Treatment Act of 1988 when enacted, expanded the definition of abuse. Sexual crimes were specifically identified in Sex Crimes Against Children Act of 1995 These laws have made child abuse a federal crime, and routinely mandate production of medical records.

==== Mandatory reporting of wounds and injuries ====
Physician-patient privilege is defined and limited by statute. Many jurisdictions have mandatory reporting laws requiring treating physicians or other medical personnel to report any suspicious injury to police or other appropriate authorities. These requirements may be imposed by statute, ordinance or regulation. Some of these may be limited to wounds typically inflicted by gun or knife. There may be similar reporting requirements in cases of domestic violence. These statutes have been generally upheld to constitutional challenges. Reporting of such cases usually voids any challenge to subpoena duces tecum of the medical records by police or state authorities.

==== Peer review records in medical licensing and hospital credential actions ====
The issue of removal of a doctor from a hospital staff, or revoking or limiting a license to practice medicine usually involve various state and federal immunities. The Healthcare Quality Improvement Act (HCQIA) of 1986 granted doctors sitting on peer review committees immunity from subpoena duces tecum, or liability for the revocation of hospital privileges of other doctors. The matters of peer review cannot, in the normal course of events, be the subject of a subpoena duces tecum. This has led to claims that powerful doctors can abuse the process to punish other doctors for reasons unrelated to medical issues (termed "sham peer review").

The American Medical Association conducted a probe of the sham peer review issue and found that no pervasive problem exists. Allegations of sham peer review are easy to make (for example, by doctors whose medical mistakes have made them targets of peer review), but actual infractions are rare. Opponents of peer review counter that the sparcity of successful challenges is indicative of how widespread the problem is and how difficult these actions are to win.

== See also ==
- Administrative Procedure Act (United States)
- Bankruptcy in the United States
- Documentary evidence
- Physician–patient privilege
- Uniform Law to Secure the Attendance of Witnesses from Within or Without a State in Criminal Proceedings
