= Double-dead meat =

Meat taken from an animal that has died of disease

Double-dead meat is the Filipino appellation for meat taken from an animal that has died of disease. The appropriate method of dealing with diseased hog carcasses is disposal by burial or burning. Illegally slaughtered meat is also referred to as hot meat or botcha.

== Legality ==
Double-dead meat comes from pigs that died from disease which are illegally cut up for sale. This meat has a dark hide and the hairs of the skin remains stuck to the fat even if it is dipped in boiling water. Hot meat on the other hand can be fit for human consumption but did not pass the necessary sanitary standards. The sale of double-dead meat is against the law in the Philippines, where under the Republic Act 9296 also known as the Meat Inspection Code and specifically the Consumer Act of the Philippines, a violator faces the penalty of a fine amounting to between Php 1,000.00 and Php 10,000.00 plus not less than six months but not more than five years imprisonment. The National Meat Inspection Service (NMIS) is tasked to monitor the meat industry process from the slaughterhouse to the markets. They are also able to confiscate meat products that were unable to pass their standards. Any person who is caught violating RA 9296 will face a cease and desist order. Their meat products are seized and buried to prevent it from being recovered and re-entering the market. The government of Quezon City is also planning on raising harsher penalties for trading illegal meat such as the immediate revocation of the business permit of the offending sellers.

== Description ==
Double-dead meat is usually pale in color with a greenish-gray tint, a sticky consistency, foul-smelling and cold, a sign that the meat has been frozen. It also commands a lower price when compared to fresh meat. Consumption of hot meat is a health hazard and may result in diarrhea and food poisoning. There was an increase in the monitoring for double-dead meat during December 2008 due to the reported incidence of Reston ebolavirus in four farms in Bulacan. There was a high demand for meat at that time due to it being Christmas.

== In popular culture ==
An episode of Bitag, an investigative television program hosted by Ben Tulfo, investigated a case of hot meat commerce in Bulacan. The suspected slaughterhouse was promptly raided by the authorities.

Press Secretary and Presidential Spokesman Ignacio R. Bunye described an impeachment complaint in 2006 against President Gloria Macapagal-Arroyo as double dead meat and that it was in the best interest of the Philippines to "bury it" and move on.
