= Soğan kebabı =

Turkish cuisine

- Course: Kebab
- Place of origin: Turkey
- Region or state: Gaziantep
- Main ingredients: Rolled ground lamb balls, baked in onions.

Soğan kebabı (Onion kebab) is a Turkish kebab dish made with ground lamb kofte baked inside sliced onions, peppers and pomegranate sauce.

The dish comes from the Gaziantep region of Southern Turkey, close to the Syrian border. It is considered to be a winter recipe, with onions being good for protecting against illnesses.

== See also ==
- List of kebabs
