= Funding by lottery =

Use of randomization to allocate research grants

Funding by lottery is the use of randomization in the allocation of science funding by research funding organizations. As of early 2025, about a dozen funders worldwide have implemented some form of funding by lottery in their funding calls.

There is no scholarly consensus on the benefits and drawbacks of funding by lottery. Proponents argue that it can help mitigate biases in funding allocation and minimize the high costs associated with grant writing and peer review. Critics, however, express concerns that diminishing the role of peer review panels in funding decisions could lead to a decline in the quality of funded projects and undermine public trust in funders, in scientific peer review, and ultimately in science at large.

== Overview ==
Science funding is generally distributed through competitive funding calls organized by research funding agencies (commonly referred to as "funders"). Eligible researchers submit research grant proposals in response to these calls, which are then evaluated by expert peer review panels. Funding is typically awarded to the proposals that receive the most positive evaluations from these panels.

Compared to this traditional, peer-reviewed science funding, funding by lottery fully or partly replaces peer review panel evaluations with random selection. In a full lottery, all eligible research grant proposals have an equal chance of winning the grant, with no input from a peer review panel. In a partial lottery, only eligible proposals that are positively evaluated by the peer review panel are entered into the lottery and have a chance to win the grant.

While some researchers advocate for the funding of science by means of full lotteries, at least for specific funding calls, all known examples of funding lotteries implemented by funders are partial lotteries.

== History ==
The selection mechanism behind funding by lottery has historical roots in the scrutiny and lot, a sortition system established in 14th-century Florence. Similar to contemporary funding by lottery, candidates in scrutiny and lot were first screened for eligibility, and then eligible individuals were randomly selected for political office. The motivation for using randomization is also comparable: in peer review, randomization is proposed as a way to reduce biases and prevent the concentration of funding in a few prestigious labs or research institutions. In Florentine sortition, randomization was designed to curb the concentration of political power among affluent families.

In the context of science funding, funding by lottery was first proposed by Daniel S. Greenberg in 1998. Greenberg argued that winning a grant in a competitive funding call is largely a matter of luck – an intuition that was later corroborated by empirical research, showing that peer review panels often struggle to distinguish among proposals around the funding line. Because the evaluations by peer review panels are so unreliable, Greenberg argued, a lottery would be an equally valid but more cost-effective method to allocate funding.

The idea remained theoretical until the 2010s, when a few funders began piloting the implementation of partial lotteries. Early adopters included the Health Research Council of New Zealand, the New Zealand Science for Technological Innovation, and the Volkswagen Foundation. These early experiments with partial lotteries were later followed by other Western funders, particularly for calls aimed at supporting transformative, innovative, blue skies, or high-risk, high-reward research.

== Types ==
Funding by lottery can be implemented in different ways. In practice, all funding lotteries used or in use by funders are partial lotteries, meaning that a peer review panel is in charge of evaluating proposals for merit and suitability, and randomization is introduced to assist in the final funding decision among positively evaluated proposals. Types of partial lotteries currently in use are: tie-breaking lotteries, partial lotteries "with bypass", and fundable-pool partial lotteries.

=== Tie-breaking partial lotteries ===
In tie-breaking partial lotteries, research grant proposals are first ranked by a peer review panel, and funding is awarded to the best-rated proposals. However, when multiple proposals receive the same evaluation at the funding threshold – meaning that the panel cannot distinguish among them – random selection is used to break the tie.

Funders using tie-breaking partial lotteries in all or some of their calls include the Swiss National Science Foundation, Natural Environment Research Council (UK), Research Council of Norway, and Science Foundation Ireland.

=== Partial lotteries "with bypass" ===
Partial lotteries "with bypass" rely on peer review panels to evaluate research grant proposals and categorize them as not fundable, fundable or outstanding. Not fundable proposals are declined. Fundable proposals enter the lottery pool. Outstanding proposals bypass the lottery and receive direct funding.

Funders using this implementation include the Volkswagen Foundation, Austrian Science Fund, and Novo Nordisk Foundation.

=== Fundable-pool partial lotteries ===
In fundable-pool partial lotteries, peer review panels evaluate research grant proposals and categorize them as either fundable or not fundable. Proposals deemed not fundable are declined, whereas those classified as fundable enter a lottery pool for random selection.

Adopters of fundable-pool partial lotteries include the Health Research Council of New Zealand, New Zealand Science for Technological Innovation, Canadian New Frontiers in Research Fund, and The British Academy.

== Scholarly debate ==
Surveys conducted in New Zealand and Germany suggest that researchers have mixed opinions on funding by lottery. Respondents seem to be more supportive of partial lotteries than full lotteries. In peer-reviewed articles and opinion pieces, scholars have outlined key arguments in favor and against the use of funding by lottery.

=== Arguments in favor ===
The main argument in favor of funding by lottery is that randomization can help reduce the costs of grant writing and peer review while promoting fairer and more diverse funding outcomes. More specifically, funding by lottery may curb or eliminate biases in research evaluation, such as reviewer conservatism – i.e. the tendency to favor conventional ideas over more innovative or riskier ones – as well as bias against interdisciplinary research.

Furthermore, funding by lottery is seen as way to counteract the growing concentration of research funding in the hands of few renowned labs and research-performing institutions, a phenomenon known as the "Matthew effect" in science funding.

Lastly, some have argued that funding by lottery could remove some incentives for research misconduct. Because grant acquisition is considered a marker of academic success, researchers may feel pressured to obtain as much funding as possible. In extreme cases, this can lead to unethical practices, like submitting virtually identical research grant proposals to multiple funding calls – a problem known as "double-dipping". By decoupling grant acquisition from academic prestige, funding by lottery could help mitigate such incentives for misconduct.

=== Arguments against ===
Some scholars highlight the lack of empirical evidence supporting the claimed benefits of funding by lottery, particularly its potential to reduce costs and bias. Others argue that less drastic reforms to peer review could address its shortcomings more effectively.

Furthermore, critics of funding by lottery identify additional potential drawbacks. First, eliminating peer review panels, or reducing their role, would deprive applicants of valuable feedback that helps improve and refine their ideas and study designs. Second, randomization could weaken quality-based selection, creating incentives to submit lower-quality proposals, and ultimately leading to a decline in quality standards.

In addition, adopting funding by lottery could undermine the legitimacy of funders and their peer review panels, potentially damaging public trust in peer review and the scientific enterprise as a whole.

== See also ==
- Funding of science
- Peer review
- Science policy
