= Adab al-Tabib =

Historical Arabic book on medical ethics

Adab al-Tabib (Arabic: أدب الطبيب Adab aț-Ṭabīb, Morals of the Physician or Conduct of a Physician) is the common title of a historical Arabic book on medical ethics, written by Al-Ruhawi, a 9th-century physician. The title can be roughly translated "Practical Ethics of the Physician". As the name suggests, it focuses on adab, the Islamic concept of etiquette and personal ethics, as it is defined in a medical context. One of the earliest texts on Islamic medical ethics, it has been called the "crowning achievement" of early works concerning adab in medicine.

== Influences ==
Al-Ruhawi was born a Christian, probably of the Nestorian sect that had split from mainstream Christianity in 530. Although it is not entirely clear, he was most likely still a Christian when he wrote Adab al-Tabib. Despite his beliefs, Adab al-Tabib is primarily an Islamic text, built upon Islamic beliefs and practices. Due to this strong Islamic influence, a modern scholar has disputed this interpretation, claiming that only a full Muslim could have produced such a text.

Adab al-Tabib builds on the works of several earlier Muslim and middle-eastern Christian philosophers and medical authorities, like Al-Kindi and Hunayn ibn Ishaq. However, it draws from many other historical traditions as well, especially those of ancient Greece. The book incorporates themes and direct quotes from Greek philosophers such as Aristotle, Plato, and Hippocrates, among others. It also borrows particularly heavily from the writings of the prominent Roman physician Galen. Despite his thoroughness in citing his influences, Al-Ruhawi notably makes no mention or acknowledgement to any earlier texts that specifically deal with Islamic medical ethics, suggesting that this book may have been the earliest work on the subject.

Because contemporary and later Islamic works have been relatively neglected in analysis, it is difficult to ascertain Al-Ruhawi's impact on later thinkers in the field. Given Al-Ruhawi's extensive research and reliance on older traditions, and the degree to which Islamic medical ethics followed his ideas, it is likely that Al-Ruhawi's book was generally well-received and accepted.

== Content ==
Adab al-Tabib is divided into twenty chapters, each dealing with a specific topic of medical ethics. They fall into three general categories: the conduct of the physician, the conduct of the patient, and the conduct of the public at large towards the medical profession and their patients. The text covers a physician's personal beliefs and practices, placing great importance on his faith in God and personal health and hygiene, as well as his manner with his colleagues, nurses, and patients. Al-Ruhawi emphasizes respect for the physician in patients and visitors, even allowing for a doctor to overrule a patient's wishes when it is necessary for their health to do so. He says that doctors should be placed high in the social hierarchy, with enough pay that they aren't forced into other work, although he also instructs doctors not to flaunt their wealth. Al-Ruhawi says that the fees charged for rich patients should be enough to cover the expenses of poor patients who cannot pay for themselves, as otherwise medical care for both the rich and the poor suffer.

In Adab al-Tabib, Al-Ruhawi also discusses legislative practices and penalties for false and incompetent doctors. To weed out quacks, he advocates medical exams and licenses, the contents of which would be heavily based on the works of Galen. He encourages doctors to keep records of the patient's symptoms, treatments, and progress, so that it may be reviewed by peers should the patient die under his care. For this reason, Adab al-Tabib records one of the first known descriptions of what we today call scholarly peer review. Although he admits that patient survival is not always possible and is ultimately up to God, Al-Ruhawi recommends severe penalties for doctors who allow patients to die through negligence, even up to execution.
