= Tirit =

Turkish dish of broth and bread

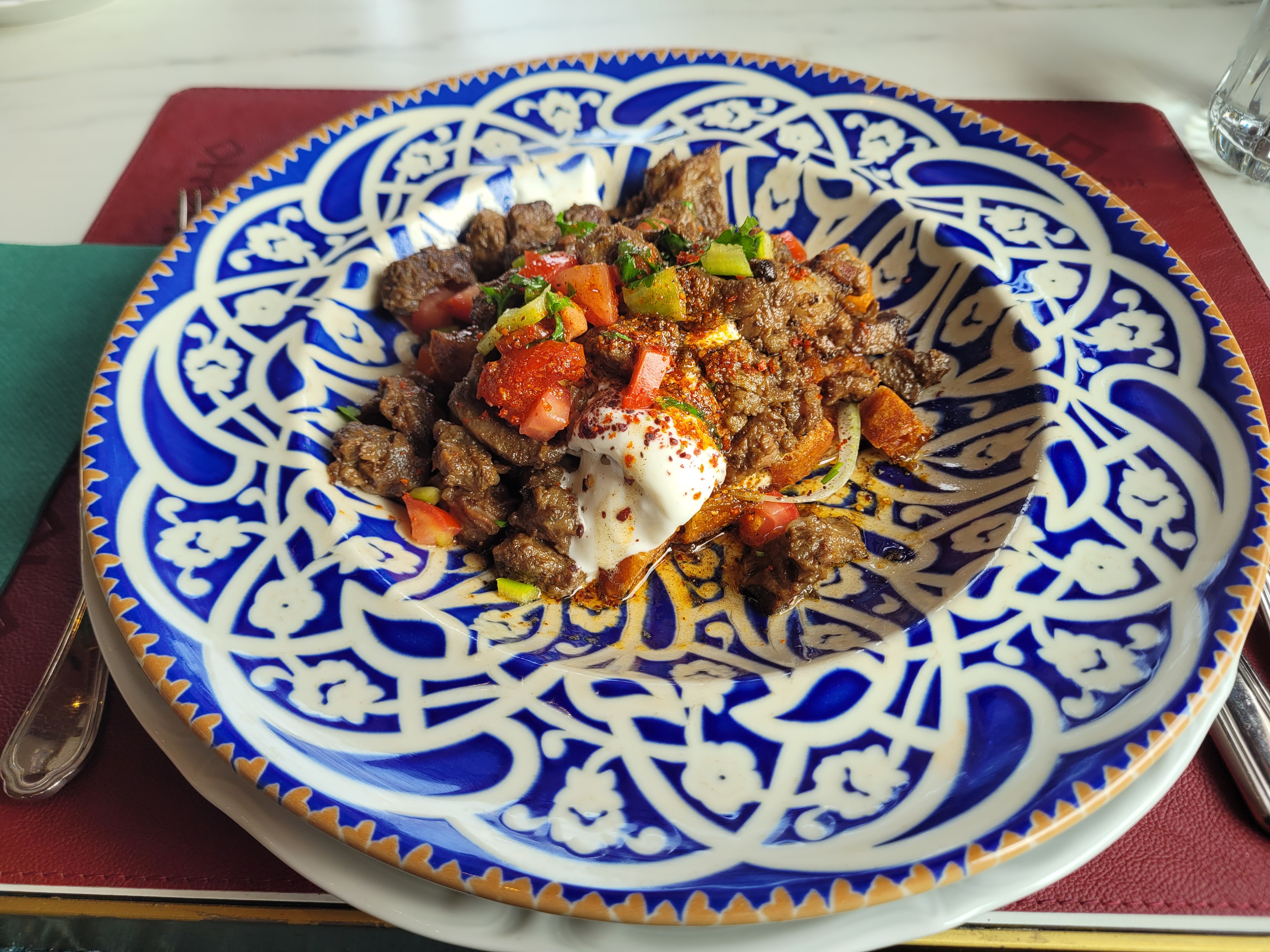
- Tirit from Konya
- Course: Main dish
- Place of origin: Turkey
- Main ingredients: lamb, pita bread, butter, sheep butter and yogurt

Trit, also known as tirit, is a Turkish dish prepared by soaking broken-up stale bread in a broth prepared from offal, and then seasoned with ground pepper and onion. Some variants add cheese or yogurt.

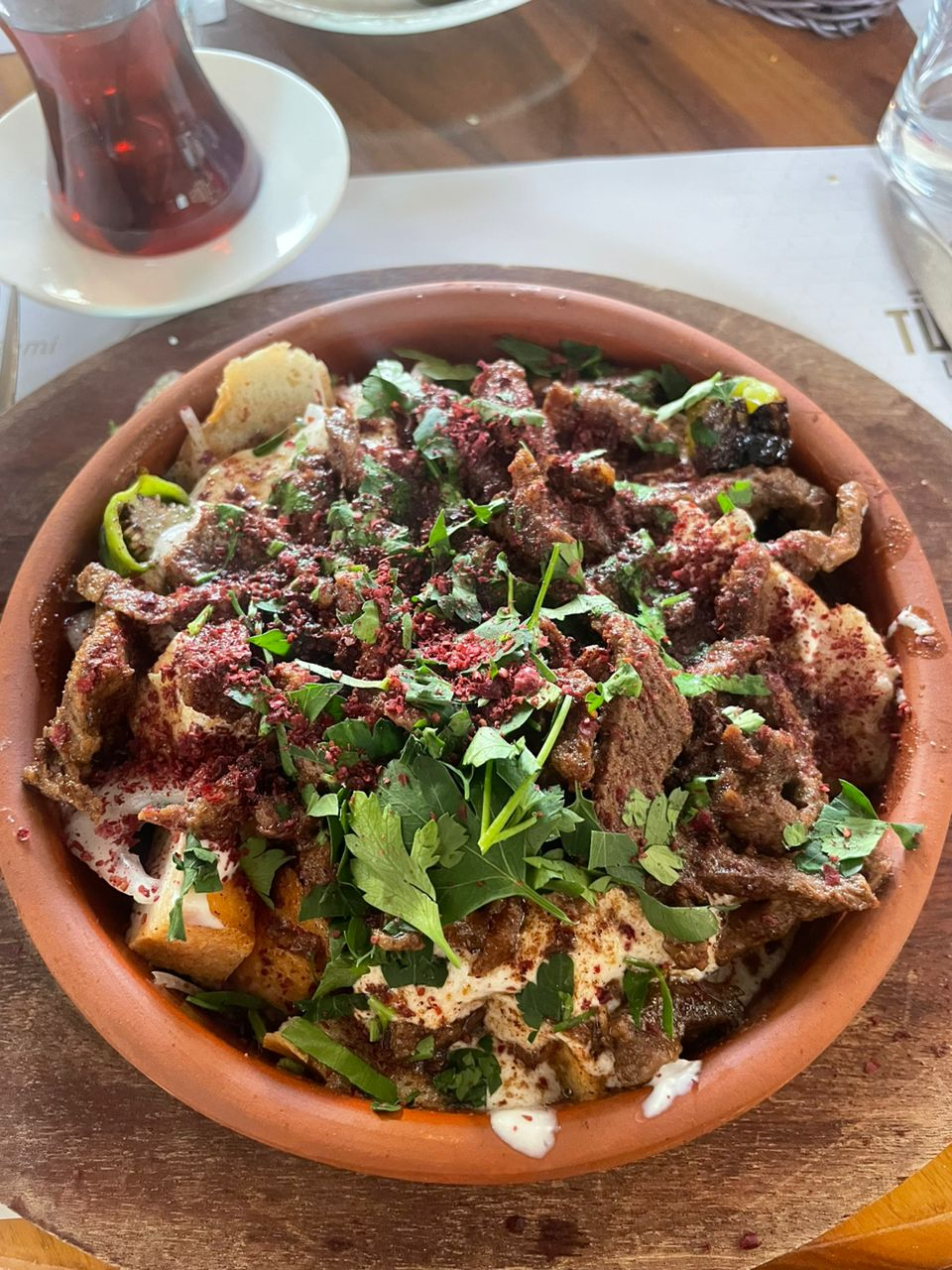
Tirit

Tirit is based on cooking techniques from Central Asia, where similar dishes were prepared using lamb and leftovers of various kinds, often including stale bread; see kuurdak.

Tirit is sometimes found in the cuisine of Mecca, where the story is told that the morale of a community hungry from famine brought about by a drought was boosted by being sustained by this dish until the return of times of greater plenty.

Khash is a similar offal-based dish eaten in many countries in Eastern Europe, Western Asia, and the southern Caucasus.

Similar combinations of offal and grain are found in haggis and some kinds of white pudding, which use oatmeal as the starch.

The forms of tirit involving cheese are similar to the barley-based Tibetan staple tsampa.

== See also ==
- Tharid
- Popara
- Beshbarmak
