= Al-Ruhawi =

9th-century Arabic writer

Ishāq bin Ali al-Rohawi (Arabic: إسحاق بن علي الرهاوي) was a 9th-century author of the first medical ethics book in Arabic medicine.

His Ethics of the Physician contains the first documented description for peer review processes. The processes gave the fundamentals of peer review processes where practising Arab physicians were reviewed by peers on the medical treatment they provide to their patients. If the treatment of a patient was incorrectly done with negative peer reviews, then the physician is at a lawsuit liability.

Al-Ruhawi was probably an Iranian-Nestorian from Al-Ruha, modern-day Şanlıurfa. It is often known as Urfa. Not much is known about Al-Ruhawi, including his beliefs. The author Levey stated in his book that Al-Ruhawi was a Nestorian Christian while Johann Christoph Bürgel wrote that Al-Ruhawi was Jewish. However, both authors did not give evidence to support their argument, rather having it based on their interpretations.

Although there are conflictions in these two beliefs, there is evidence to prove that Al-Rahawi had Islamic beliefs. Al-Rahawi began his book with the words "In the name of Allah," which is a traditional opening for Muslims. Additionally, Al-Rahawi uses the word "Allah" hundreds of times in his work, which is associated with Islam. There is also more proof for the Islamic beliefs of Al-Ruhawi in another area of his writing where he hints towards the five pillars of Islam. In his introduction of the first chapter for one of his books, Al-Ruhawi writes the following: "The first thing in which a physician must believe is that all in this world has only one able creator who performs all deeds wilfully. The second article of faith in which a physician must believe is that he have credence in the great Allah with a firm affection, and is devoted to Him with all his reason, soul, and free will. The third faith which a physician must possess is that Allah sent His messengers to mankind to teach them what is good since the mind alone is not sufficient. Thus, without His apostles, it is not enough for man...... In all these matters, the physician must truly believe since all the holy books and ancients affirm them. No believer can deny them."

== Works ==
Al-Ruhawi's most celebrated work is Adab al-Tabib ("Practical Ethics of the Physician" or "Practical Medical Deontology"), the earliest surviving Arabic work on medical ethics. In his works, Al-Ruhawi's regarded physicians as "guardians of souls and bodies". The work was based on Hippocrates and Galen and consisted of twenty chapters on various topics related to medical ethics.

Al- Ruhawi also wrote the following books:

- A compilation of first four books of Alexandrian Canons
- Introduction to Dialectics for Beginners
- On Examination of Physicians

He compiled two works based on Galen.
