= Healthcare Quality Improvement Act =

United States legislation

The Healthcare Quality Improvement Act of 1986 (HCQIA) of the United States was introduced by Congressman Ron Wyden from Oregon. (Title 42 of the United States Code, Sections 11101 - 11152)

It followed a federal antitrust suit by a surgeon against an Astoria hospital and members of its clinic in which he claimed antitrust actions were effected through the mechanism of peer review in the hospital. He claimed that a general surgeon of the clinic initiated the action due to an ongoing dispute between him and the clinic.

He prevailed in a jury trial. (The antitrust suit was later overturned by the U.S. Court of Appeals on the grounds that existing Oregon statutes already protected the peer review committee members from prosecution and that these protections should extend to federal antitrust suits brought by individuals for monetary (but not injunctive) relief.)

Soon thereafter Congressman Wyden introduced HCQIA in an effort to extend state peer review immunities on a federal level.

== Context for passage ==
The rising numbers of medical malpractice lawsuits during the preceding decade played a factor in the passage of the act. It was claimed that physicians with a history of malpractice suits could move easily from state to state with no mechanism of interstate reporting available.

Consumer groups therefore lobbied extensively for passage in the name of patient safety. They claimed, supported by statistics from the US Office of the Inspector General, that although the number of physicians was rising, disciplinary actions against physicians' licenses had not risen in proportion.

These concerns coincided with an exponential increase in malpractice lawsuits against physicians. The Medical Malpractice Trial Bar, with its system of contingency fees, had been blamed for encouraging an increasing number of frivolous, non-meritorious lawsuits over the preceding 2 decades.

In this environment, physicians and hospitals appeared reluctant to report their peers and thereby increase the overall legal liability for their profession. Malpractice insurance premiums had already begun to skyrocket due to the malpractice environment, and physicians were not inclined to make the situation worse.

During the ensuing debate, studies were published that asserted that only a small fraction of medical negligence was ever brought to a lawsuit. Several medical malpractice attorneys, such as Harvey Waschman in his text American Law of Medical Malpractice, asserted that most "malpractice lawsuits involve the type of slip-up that would be obvious to a first year medical student." The fact that only a very small number of lawsuits win on their merits (even when they are filed) suggested that the standard of negligence used by medical malpractice attorneys was not the same one used by medical professionals and the courts.

Furthermore, the studies of negligence did not attempt to separate the contribution of systems failures (not attributable to a single medical practitioner) from that of an individual physician. It has been shown since that time that system failures are common in healthcare.

== Principles of immunity for peer review participation ==
The American Medical Association lobbied for confidentiality and legal immunity for healthcare peer review processes. It theorized that only in such an environment could system failures be identified and corrected and physician participation be increased.

This immunity became incorporated into the HCQIA.

== National Practitioner Databank ==
The AMA objected to the creation of a National Practitioner Databank (NPDB) unregulated by medical boards, claiming that the number of frivolous suits that would be reported would be misleading. It claimed that there was already a databank used by state medical boards that kept a record of physician disciplinary actions.

It argued that the NPDB would be subjected to reporting of actions by non-peer reviewed committees. Their objection proved correct.

== Amendments ==
In 1991 Omnibus Budget Reconciliation Act (OBRA) required state medical boards to report "any negative action or finding" by "any peer review or accreditation entity," wresting the notion of peer review by physicians away from the National Practitioner Databank.

In California, this move was echoed as insurance agencies and health plans were enabled to perform "peer review."

This combination of events ended the ability of physicians to conduct peer review of themselves, and "peer review" of physicians became transformed into "performance appraisal" done by physicians and non-physicians alike.

Although the original HCQIA had afforded immunity to physician peer reviewers only (which were originally assumed to constitute the group of peers), the OBRA amendment conferred immunity to a widening circle of non-physician performance appraisers as well.

== Abuses ==
This set the stage for abuse of the system. Some law firms are quite open about techniques for taking advantage of the HCQIA act.
