= MetaCASE tool =

A metaCASE tool is a type of application software that provides the possibility to create one or more modeling methods, languages or notations for use within the process of software development. Often the result is a modeling tool for that language. MetaCASE tools are thus a kind of language workbench, generally considered as being focused on graphical modeling languages.

Another definition: MetaCASE tools are software tools that support the design and generation of CASE tools. In general, metaCASE tools should provide generic CASE tool components that can be customised and instantiated into particular CASE tools. The intent of metaCASE tools is to capture the specification of the required CASE tool and then generate the tool from the specification.

== Overview ==
=== Quick CASE tools overview ===
Building large-scale software applications is a complicated process, requiring that software companies have a good system of cooperation within their developed teams, as well as good discipline being a major factor.

CASE tools can be classified as either front-end or back-end tools depending on the phase of software development they are intended to support: for example, “Front-end’ analysis and design tools versus “Back-end” implementation tools. For a software engineers working on a particular application project, the choice of CASE tool would typically be determined by factors such as size of project, methodology used, availability of tools, project budget, and numbers of people involved. For some applications, a suitable tool may not be available or the project may be too small to benefit from one.

CASE tools support a fixed number of methodologies but software development organizations dynamically change their adopted methodologies.

=== Quick metaCASE tools overview ===
MetaCASE products are usually highly specialised, application development environments which produce a custom tool(set) from a high level description of the required tools.

So in other words metaCASE technology approaches the methodology automation from a dynamic perspective.

MetaCASE tools allow definition and construction of CASE tools that support arbitrary methodologies. A CASE tool customizer first specifies the desired methodology and customizes the corresponding CASE tool. Then software developers use that CASE tool to develop software systems. An advantage of this approach is that the same tool is used with different methodologies, which in turn, reduces the learning curve and consequently the cost. Any desired methodology can be automated or modified by the developing organization which provides a dynamic capability in today's dynamic and competitive world. From another perspective this technology can be used as a practical teaching tool considering the shortened length of development and learning times that suits academic course periods.

=== Differences between metaCASE and CASE tools ===
Most CASE tools for object-oriented modeling are heavily based on the UML method. A method also dictates other CASE tool functions, such as how models can be made, checked and analyzed, and how code can be generated. For example, a tool can generate CORBA IDL definitions only if the modeling language can adequately specify and analyze CORBA compliant interfaces. If the tool (and method) does not generate them, it offers very little, if any, support for work on interface design and implementation.

When using methods developers often face similar difficulties. They can not specify the domain and system under development adequately because the method does not provide concepts or notations for the task at hand. End-users may find the models difficult to read and understand because they are unfamiliar with the modeling concepts. Typically they also find it difficult to map the concepts and semantics used in the models to their application domain. After creating the models, which fail even to illustrate the application domain adequately, the tool does not provide the necessary reports nor does it generate the required code.

What is needed then is the ability to easily capture the specifications of any method and then to generate CASE tools automatically from these specifications. Later when the situation in the application domain evolves and the development environment changes you may incrementally update the method support in your CASE tool. This is exactly what metaCASE technology offers.

=== How metaCASE works ===
Traditional CASE tools are based on a two-level architecture: system designs are stored into a repository, whose schema is programmed and compiled into the CASE tool. This hard-coded part defines what kind of models can be made and how they can be analyzed. Most importantly, only the tool vendor can modify the method, because it is fixed in the code. MetaCASE technology removes this limitation by providing flexible methods.

This is achieved by adding one level above the method level.

MetaCASE tools are based on a three-level architecture:

1. The lowest, the model level, is similar to that of CASE tools. It includes system designs as models.
2. The middle level contains a model of the method, i.e. a metamodel. A metamodel includes the concepts, rules and diagramming notations of a given method. For example, a metamodel may specify concepts like a class and an inheritance, how they are related, and how they are represented. However, instead of being embedded in code in the tool, as in a fixed CASE tool, the method is stored as data in the repository. The use of metamodels has recently become more popular. Many method books now include metamodels of their method, and several important innovations, such as XMI, are metamodel-based. Unlike a CASE tool, a metaCASE tool allows the user to modify the metamodel. Hence, metaCASE is based on the flexibility of the method specifications.
3. This is achieved by having a third, higher level that includes the metamodeling language for specifying methods. This level is the hard-coded part of the metaCASE software.

All the three levels are tightly related: a model is based on a metamodel, which in turn is based on a metamodeling language. Clearly, no modeling is possible without some sort of metamodel. This dependency structure is similar to that between objects, classes and metaclasses in some object-oriented programming languages.

== metaCASE tools ==
This is a list of currently available metaCASE tools; many other modeling tools may also offer some measure of metamodeling functionality

- DOME
- GME
- MetaEdit+
- MetaDONE
- Obeo Designer
- Whole Platform
- ConceptBase

== Real benefits of using metaCASE tools ==
Jackson recognises the vital difference between an application’s domain and its code: two different worlds, each with its own language, experts, ways of thinking etc. A finished application forms the intersection between these worlds. The difficult job of the software engineer is to build a bridge between these worlds, at the same time as solving problems in both worlds.

Empirical studies have consistently shown that only around half of all development projects use methods. Among those using methods, over 50% either modify the methods to better fit to their need or even develop their own methods

In a standard CASE tool, the method supported by the tool is fixed: it cannot be changed. In a metaCASE tool, there is complete freedom to change the method, or even develop an entirely new method. Both models and metamodels (method descriptions) are stored as first-class elements in the repository. This allows an organisation to develop a method that suits their situation and needs, and to store and disseminate that knowledge to all developers. The tool and method then guide developers, provide a common framework for them to work in, and integrate the work of the whole team.

Research prototypes and even commercial metaCASE tools have existed for many years, but only recently have there been tools which are mature, user-friendly and stable for both the method developer and the method user. One of the most widely known and used metaCASE tools is MetaEdit+.

Following list represents several kinds of ways how these tools can be used within software development:

- can reduce the time and cost to develop a computer-aided environment
- can support formal software development methods
- can be used as an information systems modeling tool
- can support the creation of a wide range of modeling languages
- can support CASE and modeling language training
- can support modeling language comparison and integration

These tools should also possess the following characteristics:

- enabling users to create method support for their own software engineering methods with low learning curve
- to have easy to use graphical CASE tools to support simple and efficient user interactions
- to have the capability to check the consistency of a model, even at run-time
- to have standard report generation facility
- to possess complexity management tool that provides restricted views and granular model representations
- to possess sophisticated input dialogs for creation and modification of model data
- to possess customizable multi-method support

== See also ==
- Domain-specific modeling
- Method engineering
- CASE tool
