= SDM =

SDM may refer to:

== Technology ==
- Sigma-delta modulation
- Seed-based d mapping, a meta-analytic method for neuroimaging.
- Software development methodology
- Cap Gemini SDM, a software system development method originally written by PANDATA.
- Sparse distributed memory
- Space-division multiplexing

== Transportation ==
- Brown Field Municipal Airport, San Diego, US, IATA designator
- Shieldmuir railway station, Scotland, National Rail code
- Stadium MRT station, Singapore, MRT station abbreviation
- Sudimara railway station code in South Tangerang, Indonesia
- Watergardens railway station, Melbourne, code

== Other ==
- Scarlet Devil Mansion, a location in Embodiment of Scarlet Devil from the video game series Touhou Project
- Shared decision-making in medicine
- Shoppers Drug Mart, a Canadian pharmacy chain
- Slovenian Democratic Youth (Slovene: Slovenska demokratska mladina)
- Sociedade de Desenvolvimento Mineiro de Angola, a mining company
- Species Distribution Modelling, and Species Distribution Models, in ecology
- Squad designated marksman
- Squared deviations from the mean, in mathematics
- Standard days method, a calendar-based method of contraception
- Sub-divisional magistrate, India
- SDM, French rapper
- Maltese Demochristian Students (SDM) (Maltese: Studenti Demokristjani Maltin), a Maltese students organisation
