= Happy talk =

Style of television news presenting

Happy talk, also called banter, is the additional and often meaningless commentary interspersed into television news programs by news anchors and others on set.

It may consist of simple jokes or simply a modified wording in asking a question of another reporter. For instance, instead of a simple handoff to a sportscaster, an anchor might say, "So, Erin, what the heck happened out on that field today? Is our team going down the tubes?" Happy talk may also refer to a format of news which encourages such commentary.

== Usage ==
The term was coined by US television news executive Al Primo, who also created the Eyewitness News format.

Happy talk has been derided by some who prefer a more "traditional" and staid newscast, though it has been happening in some places since the early days of broadcasting. Employing it can backfire—some newscasters are not comfortable with happy talk and fail in their attempts to do it, and some anchor teams may not have the chemistry or working relationship to be able to pull it off believably.

Former CBS correspondent Fred Graham titled his 1990 autobiography Happy Talk: Confessions of a TV Newsman.

== Website content ==
In the popular book on web usability, Don't Make Me Think, Steve Krug identifies a kind of writing where website authors eagerly share unnecessary information about their own website. Happy talk consists of things such as:

- welcoming messages
- details of the process of creating the website such as how long it took
- information about the design of the website such as rationale
- superfluous instructional advice

Krug says that those who write happy talk do so under the misconception that visitors to the site will find it interesting, but visitors actually want to save time and get things done.

== See also ==
- Infotainment
- Least offensive programming
