= Method engineering =

Term

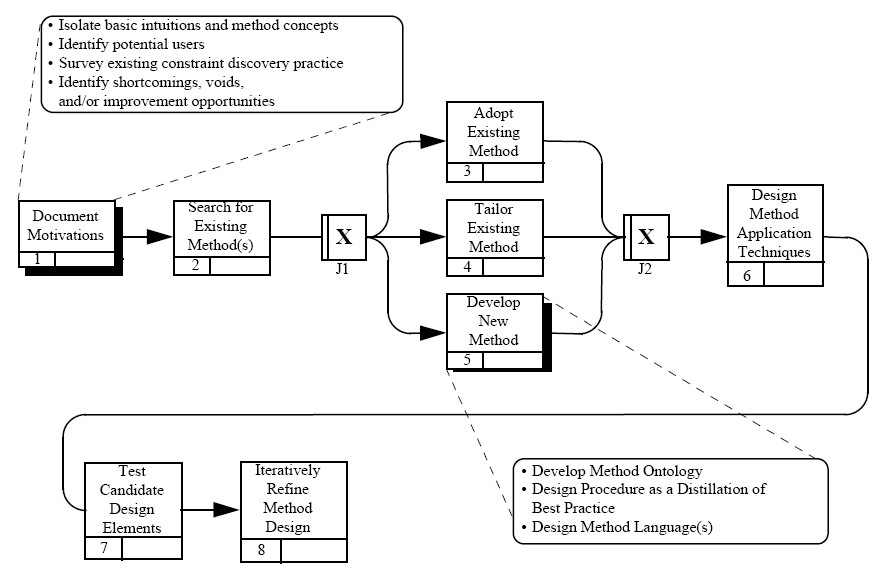
Example of a Method Engineering Process. This figure provides a process-oriented view of the approach used to develop prototype IDEF9 method concepts, a procedure, and candidate graphical and textual language elements.

Method engineering in the "field of information systems is the discipline to construct new methods from existing methods". It focuses on "the design, construction and evaluation of methods, techniques and support tools for information systems development".

Furthermore, method engineering "wants to improve the usefulness of systems development methods by creating an adaptation framework whereby methods are created to match specific organisational situations".

== Types ==
=== Computer aided method engineering ===
The meta-process modeling process is often not supported through software tools, called computer aided method engineering (CAME) tools, or MetaCASE tools (Meta-level Computer Assisted Software Engineering tools). Often the instantiation technique "has been utilised to build the repository of Computer Aided Method Engineering environments". There are many tools for meta-process modeling.

=== Method tailoring ===
In the literature, different terms refer to the notion of method adaptation, including 'method tailoring', 'method fragment adaptation' and 'situational method engineering'. Method tailoring is defined as:

A process or capability in which human agents through responsive changes in, and dynamic interplays between contexts, intentions, and method fragments determine a system development approach for a specific project situation.

Potentially, almost all agile methods are suitable for method tailoring. Even the DSDM method is being used for this purpose and has been successfully tailored in a CMM context. Situation-appropriateness can be considered as a distinguishing characteristic between agile methods and traditional software development methods, with the latter being relatively much more rigid and prescriptive. The practical implication is that agile methods allow project teams to adapt working practices according to the needs of individual projects. Practices are concrete activities and products that are part of a method framework. At a more extreme level, the philosophy behind the method, consisting of a number of principles, could be adapted.

=== Situational method engineering ===
Situational method engineering is the construction of methods which are tuned to specific situations of development projects. It can be described as the creation of a new method by

1. selecting appropriate method components from a repository of reusable method components,
2. tailoring these method components as appropriate, and
3. integrating these tailored method components to form the new situation-specific method.

This enables the creation of development methods suitable for any development situation. Each system development starts then, with a method definition phase where the development method is constructed on the spot.

In case of mobile business development, there are methods available for specific parts of the business model design process and ICT development. Situational method engineering can be used to combine these methods into one unified method that adopts the characteristics of mobile ICT services.

== Method engineering process ==
The developers of the IDEF modeling languages, Richard J. Mayer et al. (1995), have developed an early approach to method engineering from studying common method engineering practice and experience in developing other analysis and design methods. The following figure provides a process-oriented view of this approach. This image uses the IDEF3 Process Description Capture method to describe this process where boxes with verb phrases represent activities, arrows represent precedence relationships, and "exclusive or" conditions among possible paths are represented by the junction boxes labeled with an "X.".

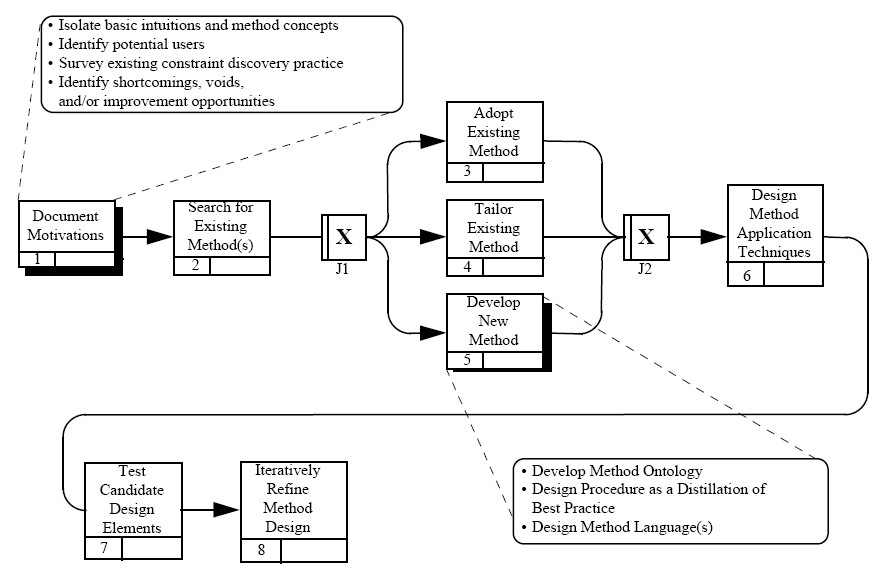
This image provides a general overview of the IDEF Method engineering process approach.

According to this approach there are three basic strategies in method engineering:

- Reuse: one of the basic strategies of methods engineering is reuse. Whenever possible, existing methods are adopted.
- Tailormade: find methods that can satisfy the identified needs with minor modification. This option is an attractive one if the modification does not require a fundamental change in the basic concepts or design goals of the method.
- New development: Only when neither of these options is viable should method designers seek to develop a new method.

This basic strategies can be developed in a similar process of concept development

=== Knowledge engineering approach ===
A knowledge engineering approach is the predominant mechanism for method enhancement and new method development. In other words, with very few exceptions, method development involves isolating, documenting, and packaging existing practice for a given task in a form that promotes reliable success among practitioners. Expert attunements are first characterized in the form of basic intuitions and method concepts. These are often initially identified through analysis of the techniques, diagrams, and expressions used by experts. These discoveries aid in the search for existing methods that can be leveraged to support novice practitioners in acquiring the same attunements and skills.

New method development is accomplished by establishing the scope of the method, refining characterizations of the method concepts and intuitions, designing a procedure that provides both task accomplishment and basic apprenticeship support to novice practitioners, and developing a language(s) of expression. Method application techniques are then developed outlining guidelines for use in a stand-alone mode and in concert with other methods. Each element of the method then undergoes iterative refinement through both laboratory and field testing.

=== Method language design process ===
The method language design process is highly iterative and experimental in nature. Unlike procedure development, where a set of heuristics and techniques from existing practice can be identified, merged, and refined, language designers rarely encounter well-developed graphical display or textual information capture mechanisms. When potentially reusable language structures can be found, they are often poorly defined or only partially suited to the needs of the method.

A critical factor in the design of a method language is clearly establishing the purpose and scope of the method. The purpose of the method establishes the needs the method must address. This is used to determine the expressive power required of the supporting language. The scope of the method establishes the range and depth of coverage which must also be established before one can design an appropriate language design strategy. Scope determination also involves deciding what cognitive activities will be supported through method application. For example, language design can be confined to only display the final results of method application (as in providing IDEF9 with graphical and textual language facilities that capture the logic and structure of constraints). Alternatively, there may be a need for in-process language support facilitating information collection and analysis. In those situations, specific language constructs may be designed to help method practitioners organize, classify, and represent information that will later be synthesized into additional representation structures intended for display.

With this foundation, language designers begin the process of deciding what needs to be expressed in the language and how it should be expressed. Language design can begin by developing a textual language capable of representing the full range of information to be addressed. Graphical language structures designed to display select portions of the textual language can then be developed. Alternatively, graphical language structures may evolve prior to, or in parallel with, the development of the textual language. The sequence of these activities largely depends on the degree of understanding of the language requirements held among language developers. These may become clear only after several iterations of both graphical and textual language design.

=== Graphical language design ===
Graphical language design begins by identifying a preliminary set of schematics and the purpose or goals of each in terms of where and how they will support the method application process. The central item of focus is determined for each schematic. For example, in experimenting with alternative graphical language designs for IDEF9, a Context Schematic was envisioned as a mechanism to classify the varying environmental contexts in which constraints may apply. The central focus of this schematic was the context. After deciding on the central focus for the schematic, additional information (concepts and relations) that should be captured or conveyed is identified.

Up to this point in the language design process, the primary focus has been on the information that should be displayed in a given schematic to achieve the goals of the schematic. This is where the language designer must determine which items identified for possible inclusion in the schematic are amenable to graphical representation and will serve to keep the user focused on the desired information content. With this general understanding, previously developed graphical language structures are explored to identify potential reuse opportunities. While exploring candidate graphical language designs for emerging IDEF methods, a wide range of diagrams were identified and explored. Quite often, even some of the central concepts of a method will have no graphical language element in the method.

For example, the IDEF1 Information Modeling method includes the notion of an entity but has no syntactic element for an entity in the graphical language.8. When the language designer decides that a syntactic element should be included for a method concept, candidate symbols are designed and evaluated. Throughout the graphical language design process, the language designer applies a number of guiding principles to assist in developing high quality designs. Among these, the language designer avoids overlapping concept classes or poorly defined ones. They also seek to establish intuitive mechanisms to convey the direction for reading the schematics.

For example, schematics may be designed to be read from left to right, in a bottom-up fashion, or center-out. The potential for clutter or overwhelmingly large amounts of information on a single schematic is also considered as either condition makes reading and understanding the schematic extremely difficult.

=== Method testing ===
Each candidate design is then tested by developing a wide range of examples to explore the utility of the designs relative to the purpose for each schematic. Initial attempts at method development, and the development of supporting language structures in particular, are usually complicated. With successive iterations on the design, unnecessary and complex language structures are eliminated.

As the graphical language design approaches a level of maturity, attention turns to the textual language. The purposes served by textual languages range from providing a mechanism for expressing information that has explicitly been left out of the graphical language to providing a mechanism for standard data exchange and automated model interpretation. Thus, the textual language supporting the method may be simple and unstructured (in terms of computer interpretability), or it may emerge as a highly structured, and complex language. The purpose of the method largely determines what level of structure will be required of the textual language.

=== Formalization and application techniques ===
As the method language begins to approach maturity, mathematical formalization techniques are employed so the emerging language has clear syntax and semantics. The method formalization process often helps uncover ambiguities, identify awkward language structures, and streamline the language.

These general activities culminate in a language that helps focus user attention on the information that needs to be discovered, analyzed, transformed, or communicated in the course of accomplishing the task for which the method was designed. Both the procedure and language components of the method also help users develop the necessary skills and attunements required to achieve consistently high quality results for the targeted task.

Once the method has been developed, application techniques will be designed to successfully apply the method in stand-alone mode as well as together with other methods. Application techniques constitute the "use" component of the method which continues to evolve and grow throughout the life of the method. The method procedure, language constructs, and application techniques are reviewed and tested to iteratively refine the method.

== See also ==
- Computer-aided software engineering
- Configuration management
- Design pattern
- Design rationale
- ISO/IEC 24744
- Metadata modeling
- Pattern language
- Technical documentation
