= Oracle unified method =

The Oracle unified method (OUM), first released by Oracle Corporation in 2006, is a standards-based method with roots in the unified process (UP). OUM is business-process and use-case driven and includes support for the Unified Modeling Language (UML), though the use of UML is not required. OUM combines these standards with aspects of Oracle's legacy methods and Oracle implementation best-practices.

OUM is applicable to any size or type of information technology project. While OUM is a plan-based method – that includes extensive overview material, task and artifact descriptions, and associated templates – the method is intended to be tailored to support the appropriate level of ceremony required for each project. Guidance is provided for identifying the minimum subset of tasks, tailoring the project approach, executing iterative and incremental project planning, and applying agile techniques. Supplemental guidance provides specific support for Oracle products, tools, and technologies.

== Supported topics ==
OUM v6.4.0 provides support for:

- Application implementation
- Cloud application services implementation
- Software upgrade projects

as well as the complete range of technology projects including:

- Business intelligence (BI)
- Enterprise security
- WebCenter
- Service-oriented architecture (SOA)
- Application Integration Architecture (AIA)
- Business process management (BPM)
- Enterprise integration
- Custom software

Detailed techniques and tool guidance are provided, including a supplemental guide related to Oracle Tutor and UPK.

== Availability ==
OUM is available for use by Oracle employees; for Oracle PartnerNetwork Diamond, Platinum, and Gold Partners; and for customers who participate in the OUM Customer Program.

Legacy method retirement dates:

- Oracle Custom Development Method (CDM), February 2010
- Oracle CDM Fast Track, February 2010
- Oracle Application Implementation Methodology (AIM), January 2011
- Oracle AIM for Business Flows, January 2011
- Oracle's Siebel Results Roadmap, January 2011
- Oracle Data Warehouse Method (DWM) Fast Track, May 2011
- Oracle EasiPath Migration Method (EMM), December 2011
- Oracle's PeopleSoft Compass Methodology, June 2013
