= MSCW =

MSCW may refer to:

- Mississippi University for Women
- MoSCoW method for assigning priority in software development projects
- MapleStory Classic World
