= Soft ergonomics =

Subset of Ergonomics

Soft ergonomics is the study of designing virtual interfaces that cater towards the wellness of the human body, its emotional and cognitive abilities.

Soft ergonomics is a subset of ergonomics and human factors engineering, a larger body of the study of human abilities for designing equipment and devices that fit the human body. Soft ergonomics can be thus defined as the ability of any virtual interface(computer application, website, ATM options, parking meter etc.) to make it comfortable for the user to use the interface while working on the user's request.

== Overview ==
Soft ergonomics only deals with virtual interfaces. It tries to find a compromise between user expectations, system workflow and aesthetics. Users from various cultural and technological background are exposed to a common interface. The interface developer seeks to ensure that the interface does not harm the user psychologically, physiologically or emotionally. Soft ergonomics generally takes into account the following human factors when building a virtual interface:

1. Physical Limitations: Not all who use a virtual interface are physically equal. If the designed interface only caters to right-handed individuals, or people within a certain height range, then the interface might need a redesign. One of the leading discussion is with respect to visually impaired users.

2. Cognitive Abilities: If the product (e.g. software application, website) is designed for any casual user, then the designer should not expect that all users will be experts with high cognitive abilities. The usage of the application should not need the user to know a lot of information prior to using the interface. For example, using an automated teller machine can require memorizing a pin number but not the account number.

3. Emotional Needs: The interface should be 'designed for the occasion' or context. It should not leave the user confused, either by how to start using the interface or what to do when an error occurs. Confusion leads to frustration, which eventually builds stress in the body causing long term emotional damage.

== Criteria for Soft Ergonomics ==
The following lists (non-exhaustive) some of the most common criteria for evaluating soft ergonomics.

1. Consistency: The design should be consistent across the entire application. Consistent sequence of actions, identical terminologies and platform conventions should be followed throughout the application.

2. Efficiency: The virtual interface should allow efficient use of user's time. The screens should load and display content within acceptable amount of time. The more than expected time a user has to wait, more stress is built into the human body causing long term damage. The interface should also have functionality for advanced users. While being non-obtrusive to novice users, accelerators or shortcuts should be available for experienced users.

3. Design: The system should preferably have minimalistic and aesthetically pleasing design. While this has no direct relation to the product or task in hand, minimalistic design help user easily consume the data and hence there is less stress on the human mind and aesthetically pleasing design increases the 'feel good' factor in the user. Following the principles of contrast, repetition, alignment and proximity will also help as they come naturally to humans.

4. Memory: User's memory load should be minimized. All information that a user needs from the application to perform a task should be presented or easily retrievable by the user.

5. Context Help: While the 'Help' menu and options should not be obstructive to the user, context help should be always available to the user.

== See also ==
- Engineering psychology
- Human–computer interaction
- Human-centered computing
- Human-in-the-loop
- Usability
- User experience design
- User-centered design

== Books ==
- Cyberpsychology: An Introduction to Human-Computer Interaction by Kent Norman (2008) Cambridge University of Press.
- Don't make me think!: A common sense approach to web usability by Steve Krug (2006) New Riders.
- Designing with the mind in mind: Simple guide to understanding user interface design rules by Jeff Johnson (2010) Morgan Kaufmann Publishers/Elsevier.
