= Internet-speed development =

Agile software development method

Internet-Speed development is an Agile Software Development development method using a combined spiral model/waterfall model with daily builds aimed at developing a product with high speed.

It was developed in the late nineties because software development was changing rapidly. Companies were having problems delivering products with the correct requirements within the time scheduled for the project and as such were changing to more agile software development methods. More details about how the internet-speed method was developed can be seen in the evolutionary map in the paper of Abrahamsson.

== Goal of the method ==
The goal of the internet-speed development method is to allow software developers to perform a project in a structured way, but still be able to adapt to the needs of the customer. It aims to deliver a software product in a short time through intensive development. The method provides a means to deliver a fully implemented system and also has ways to determine progress in a project through the use of milestones. One of the main versions of this method is created by Microsoft and is called the Microsoft Solutions Framework.

== The concepts behind Internet-speed development method ==
The first concept that is very important to internet-speed development is the creation of a vision and scope (project management). What this means is that in the beginning of the project a global definition of the system is created which explains what the system aims to be and what is within the scope and what is not. This is one of the fundamental steps as it gives the developers some guidelines as to what the system will be without freezing any requirements. The scope can be documented in a vision statement.

Another very important concept within this method is scope management. The scope needs to be managed throughout the project to prevent scope creeping which results in delays. The scope will be determined early and changes to the scope (like adding additional features which were at first considered beyond the scope of the project) will be evaluated and either accepted or rejected. Changes in the scope can be made but this will always be affected by trade offs between features, resources and time.

The internet-speed development method is very different from the traditional methods and therefore uses Agile method principles. It focuses on adaptation to requirements and as such is based on the basic principles of Agile software development.

Internet-speed development also focuses on using one fixed framework architecture from which the product is built and relies heavily on tools to increase the development speed.

Another basic concept of internet-speed development is that it also focuses on using small teams. The idea is that all projects can be divided into smaller activities which often can be done parallel. Smaller teams can often be more focused on their task and it is easier to determine accountability and monitor progress within the project.

The last concept discussed in this entry of internet-speed development is the concept of parallel development. This concept basically means that all the software development is done in parallel as often as possible. This will allow very quick development and it allows the smaller teams to focus on their own feature as much as possible which has a good result on quality. To ensure that the smaller teams do work together to create the final system it is however needed to synchronize their development frequently. This can be done using daily builds which means that all the developers check their code in at the end of the day after which a build is created which can then be evaluated and tested to monitor progress. After a feature is completed in the build it needs to be tested and refined which is sometimes called the synch-and-stabilize process. The developed features are synchronized with the build and tested. After these tests any bugs will be corrected and the feature can be refined to work better (which is the stabilization part).

Internet-speed development is based on the agile principles and as such it has a lot of similarities with Extreme Programming, Rational Unified Process, DSDM and Feature Driven Development. Internet-speed development is different however from these methods as it also incorporates a more extensive risk-management planning and has quality as a very important objective of a project. The development phase of Internet-speed development also shows some similarities with the open-source software development model because many developers around the globe can be part of the development process because of communication through the Internet and the use of repositories for storing the code and documentation.

== The phases of Internet-Speed Development ==
The model behind this method looks like this: Figure 1: Phase model This model shows the five basic phases of the method. These phases will be explained in the following sections of this entry. The phases are: Envisioning, Planning, Developing, Stabilizing and Deploying. After this cycle has been completed a version of the system is ready and a new cycle begins to create a new version. The phases are explained in the following sections and are shown through a meta-modeling technique. More details about multiplicities and concepts in a project context can be seen in the overall data model later on.

=== Envisioning phase ===
The envisioning phase can be modeled as follows:

Figure 2: Envisioning phase process/data model

Activity	Definition (source)
Analyze requirements	During the envisioning phase, business requirements must be identified and analyzed. “These are refined more rigorously during the planning phase.” (MSF Process model)
Define Goals and Constraints	“Envisioning, by creating a high-level view of the project’s goals and constraints.” (MSF Process model)
Form Team	Formation of the core team.
Create Vision/scope	“The preparation and delivery of a vision/scope document.” (MSF Process model)
Create Risk assessment	“During the envisioning phase, the team prepares a risk document and presents the top risks.” (MSF Process model)

Table 1: Envisioning activities

The basic activities performed in the envisioning phase are analyzing the requirements, forming the team for the project, determining the risks and the scope of the project. From the requirements and the goals of the project a Vision/Scope document is created. This document describes what the product is to be when it is delivered. It does not contain very detailed functionalities of the product.

Concept	Definition (source)
VISION/SCOPE DOCUMENT	“Document defining the Vision and Scope.” (MSF Process model)
VISION	“Visionis an unbounded view of what a solution may be.” (MSF Process model)
SCOPE	“Scope identifies the part(s) of the vision can be accomplished within the project constraints.” (MSF Process model)
RISK ASSESSMENT DOCUMENT	“Standardized document for Risk Assessment” (MSF Risk Management Discipline)
PRIORITIZED RISK LIST	“Detailed risk information including project condition, context, root cause, and the metrics used for prioritization (probability, impact, exposure) are often recorded for each risk in the risk statement form.” (MSF Risk Management Discipline)
RISK PLANNING	“Translation of the prioritized risk list into action plans.” (MSF Risk Management Discipline)
PROJECT STRUCTURE DOCUMENT	“The project structure document includes information on how the team is organized and who plays which roles and has specific responsibilities. The project structure document also clarifies the chain of accountability to the customer and designated points of contact that the project team has with the customer. These can vary depending on the circumstances of the project.” (MSF Process model)
TEAM ORGANIZATION	“Information on how the team is organized.” (MSF Process model)
CONTACT POINTS	“Designated points of contact that the project team has with the customer.” (MSF Process model)
TEAM ROLES	“Definition of who plays which roles and has specific responsibilities.” (MSF Process model)

Table 2: Concepts in the envisioning phase

=== Planning Phase ===
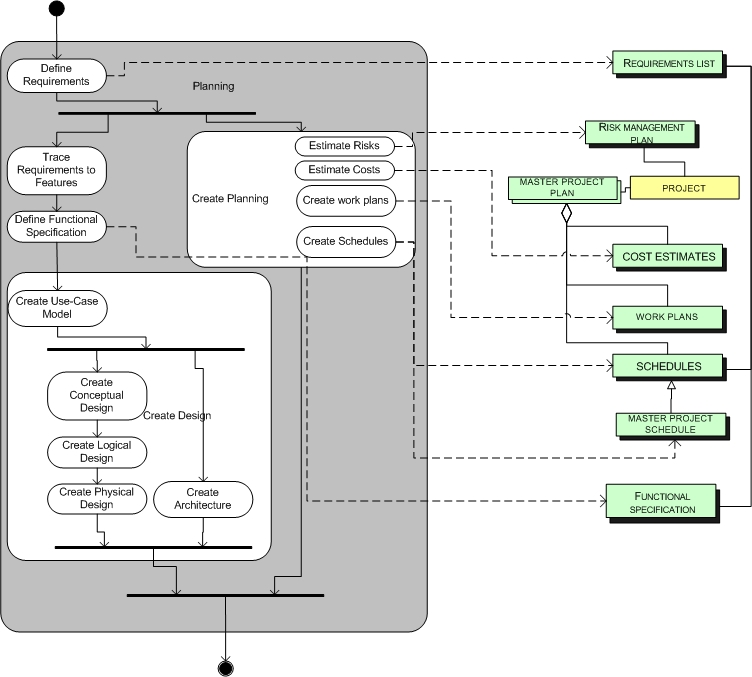
Figure 3: Planning phase process/data model

Activity		Definition (source)
Define Requirements		Early in the planning phase, the team analyzes and documents requirements in a list or tool. Requirements fall into four broad categories: business requirements, user requirements, operational requirements, and system requirements (those of the solution itself).” (MSF Process model)
Trace Requirements to Features		“As the team moves on to design the solution and create the functional specifications, it is important to maintain traceability between requirements and features. Traceability does not have to be on a one to one basis. Maintaining traceability serves as one way to check the correctness of design and to verify that the design meets the goals and requirements of the solution.” (MSF Process model
Define Functional Specification		“The team prepares the functional specification.” (MSF Process model
Create Planning	Estimate Risks	Team creates a risk estimation.
Create Planning	Estimate Costs	Team creates a costs estimation.
Create Planning	Create work plans	Team creates work plans.
Create Planning	Create Schedules	Team creates schedules.
Create Design	Create Use-Case Model	“This begins with a systematic analysis of user profiles (also called “personas”) which describe various types of users and their job functions (operations staff are users too). Much of this is often done during the envisioning phase. These are broken into a series of usage scenarios, where a particular type of user is attempting to complete a type of activity, such as front desk registration in a hotel or administering user passwords for a system administrator. Finally, each usage scenario is broken into a specific sequence of tasks, known as use cases, which the user performs to complete that activity. This is called “story-boarding.”” (MSF Process model
Create Design	Create Conceptual Design	Creation of a conceptual design.
Create Design	Create Logical Design	Creation of a logical design.
Create Design	Create Physical Design	Creation of a physical design.
Create Design	Create Architecture	Creation of the architecture for the product.

Table 3: Planning activities In the planning phase a functional specification is created from the requirements. Features selected are included in this specification (a MoSCoW Method is often used for the features so they can be prioritized more easily). Also, the basic design and planning are created in this phase. The design however is in this phase not frozen as changes may be made in the development phase.

Concept	Definition (source)
REQUIREMENTS LIST	Documentation of requirements in a list or tool.” (MSF Process model
RISK MANAGEMENT PLAN	Document on how the team plans to implement the risk management process within the context of the project.” (MSF Risk Management Discipline )
MASTER PROJECT PLAN	All plans are synchronized and presented together as the master project plan.” (MSF Process model
WORKPLANS	A plan or plans for the deliverables that pertain to the role and participates in team planning sessions.” (MSF Process model
COST ESTIMATES	An estimation of the costs of the project.
SCHEDULES	Time estimates and schedules for Deliverables.” (MSF Process model
MASTER PROJECT SCHEDULE	The various schedules are then synchronized and integrated into a master project schedule.” (MSF Process model
FUNCTIONAL SPECIFICATION	The functional specification describes in detail how each feature is to look and behave. It also describes the architecture and the design for all the features.” (MSF Process model

Table 4: Concepts in the planning phase

=== Development phase ===
Figure 4: Developing phase process/data model

Activity	Definition (source)
Develop Features	Building of solution components (documentation as well as code).” (MSF Process model) Also includes testing after the daily build, bug fixing and evaluating the features.
Create Daily Build	Creation of a build after a workday.
Finalize Scope	At this milestone, all features are complete and the solution is ready for external testing and stabilization.” (MSF Process model)
Develop Infrastructure	The infrastructure is developed.” (MSF Process model)

Table 5: Developing activities The most important activity in the developing phase is the development of the features. Besides the implementation of these features the scope is also finalized in this phase. During development new features may be added to the product, but once the scope is finalized the features become frozen and ready for testing and stabilizing. The infrastructure is also developed in this phase which means that network structures are identified and servers like for example a database server are defined.

Concept	Definition (source)
INSTALLATION SCRIPTS AND CONFIGURATION SETTINGS FOR DEPLOYMENT	A collection of scripts and settings needed for the product to install/run.
INSTALLATION SCRIPTS	The scripts needed to install the product.
CONFIGURATION SETTINGS	The configuration properties of the product.
PERFORMANCE SUPPORT ELEMENTS	Elements that support the performance of the product (extra databases, servers etc.).
TEST SPECIFICATIONS AND TEST CASES	Specification of the tests and test cases used to validate the product.
FUNCTIONAL SPECIFICATION	The functional specification describes in detail how each feature is to look and behave. It also describes the architecture and the design for all the features.” (MSF Process model)
SOURCE CODE AND EXECUTABLES	The source code/executables combination.
SOURCE CODE	The source code of the product.
EXECUTABLE	The executable created by source code.

Table 5: Concepts in the developing phase

=== stabilization phase ===
Figure 5: Stabilization phase process/data model

Activity	Definition (source)
Testing	Testing during this phase emphasizes usage and operation under realistic environmental conditions.“ (MSF Process model)
Resolve Bugs	The team focuses on resolving and triaging (prioritizing) bugs and preparing the solution for release.” (MSF Process model)
Deploy Pilot	Once a build has been deemed stable enough to be a release candidate, the solution is deployed to a pilot group.” (MSF Process model)
Review	Once reviewed and approved, the solution is ready for full deployment to the live production environment.” (MSF Process model)

Table 6: Stabilization activities The main activities are the testing and resolving of bugs. Once a build version is considered stable enough for a pilot a pilot version is created and deployed. From this pilot it will either go back into the testing/stabilizing loop or it will be approved and reviewed.

Concept	Definition (source)
TEST RESULTS AND TESTING TOOLS	Collection of test results and tools used for testing.
TEST RESULTS	Results of executed tests.
TESTING TOOLS	Tools used for testing.
GOLDEN RELEASE	The version used for the final reviewing.
RELEASE NOTES	Notes for a release version.
SOURCE CODE AND EXECUTABLE	The source code/executables combination.
SOURCE CODE	The source code of the product.
EXECUTABLE	The executable created by source code.
MILESTONE REVIEW	Review of the final version and the project documents.
PROJECT DOCUMENTS	Collection of all the project documents.

Table 7: Concepts in Stabilization phase

=== deployment phase ===
Figure 6: Deployment phase process/data model

Activity	Definition (source)
Deploy the Core Components	Deployment of all components needed by the product (such as database servers, mail servers etc.)
Deploy the solution on site	For tailor-made systems deployment of the product occurs here (can be skipped for software products).
Stabilize the deployment	Tacking, monitoring and improving the deployed components.
Transfer the project to operations and support	Transferring all documents and code to the operations and support team.
Obtain final approval from customer	The customer must agree that the team has met its objectives before it can declare the solution to be in production and close out the project. This requires a stable solution, as well as clearly stated success criteria. In order for the solution to be considered stable, appropriate operations and support systems must be in place.” (MSF Process model)
Review the project	Final review of the project.

Table 8: Deploying activities The main activity in the deploying phase is the installation of the infrastructure needed to run the product (deployment of servers etc.). Also, the documents are finalized and transferred to the operations and support department, a knowledge base is created and the product and project are reviewed by the customer (if applicable) and the project team.

Concept	Definition (source)
PROCEDURES AND PROCESSES	Collection of procedures and processes.
PROCEDURES	Collection of procedures to be used for installation and operation of the product.
PROCESSES	Collection of processes to be used for installation and operation of the product.
KNOWLEDGE BASE, REPORTS, LOGBOOKS	Collection of the knowledge base, reports and logbooks.
KNOWLEDGE BASE	The knowledge base associated with the product.
REPORTS	The reports associated with the product.
LOGBOOKS	Logbooks associated with the product.
DOCUMENT REPOSITORY	A repository of all documents.
FINAL VERSIONS OF ALL PROJECT DOCUMENTS	The final versions of the project documents.
OPERATION AND SUPPORT INFORMATION SYSTEMS	Systems used by the operation and support teams associated with the product.
CUSTOMER/USER SATISFACTION DATA	Collection of data from the customer/user about his satisfaction with the product.
DEFINITION OF NEXT STEPS	Description of next steps to take for evolving the product.
PROJECT CLOSE-OUT REPORT	Final report on the product, project and the transfer to operations and support.

Table 9: Concepts in Deploying phase

=== Overall data model ===
Figure 7: Overall data model This data model shows all the concepts with multiplicities and relations in a full project context.

== Tools for use with Internet-Speed Development ==
- Drawing tools (examples: Microsoft Visio, Rational Rose, Dia) For making diagrams.
- Word processors (examples: Microsoft Word, OpenOffice.org Writer, AbiWord, Calligra Words) For making text documents like a vision statement or scope document.
- Spreadsheets (examples: Microsoft Excel, OpenOffice.org Calc, Gnumeric, Calligra Sheets) For making prioritized risk lists and making cost calculations.
- Project tools (examples: Microsoft Project, OpenProj, Gnome Planner, Calligra Plan) For planning project activities.
- Database and database management tools (examples: MS SQL Server, MySQL, Oracle, PostgreSQL) For making knowledge bases.
- Automated testing tools (examples: Test scripts) For executing tests after each daily build.

== See also ==
- Agile software development
- Incremental and iterative development
- Microsoft Solutions Framework
- Dynamic systems development method (DSDM)
- MoSCoW Method
