= Mayo-Smith pyramid =

Animatic of 3D Mayo Smith Pyramid

A Mayo-Smith pyramid is a triangle divided into a sequence of isosceles trapezoids configured such that the outer perimeter maintains the shape of a triangle with each additional element. A Mayo-Smith pyramid is used to describe system development methodologies adapted for scenarios characterized by schedule and resource uncertainty.

"Two Ways to Build a Pyramid" was published in 2001. In this, the Mayo-Smith pyramid sequence (see Figure B) is used to illustrate a specific case study, and contrasted with a less favorable sequence (see Figure A).

While Mayo-Smith's pyramid is typically depicted as a two dimensional sequence, it may also be depicted in three dimensions.
