= Scott Ambler =

Canadian software engineer

Scott W. Ambler (born 1966) is a Canadian software engineer, consultant and author. He is an author of books about the Disciplined Agile Delivery toolkit, the Unified process, Agile software development, the Unified Modeling Language, and Capability Maturity Model (CMM) development.

He regularly runs surveys which explore software development issues and works with organizations in different countries on their approach to software development.

== Biography ==
Ambler received a BSc in computer science and an MA in information science from the University of Toronto. He has been working in the IT industry since the mid-1980s, with object technology since the early 1990s, and in IT methodologies since the mid-1990s. Scott has led the development of several software processes, including Disciplined Agile Delivery (DAD) (with Mark Lines), Agile Modeling (AM), Agile Data (AD), Enterprise Unified Process (EUP), and Agile Unified Process (AUP) methodologies. Scott was a Senior Consulting Partner with SA+A and then became the Chief Scientist at Disciplined Agile which became a part of the Project Management Institute while helping organizations around the world to improve their IT processes.

Ambler was a contributing editor with Dr. Dobb's Journal, and has written columns for Software Development, Object Magazine, and Computing Canada.

He is speaker at a wide variety of practitioner and academic conferences worldwide. Public conferences include Agile 20XX, Agile India 20XX, Software Development, Agile Universe, UML World, JavaOne, OOPSLA, EuroSPI, and CAiSE. Scott also is a keynote speaker at private conferences organized by large, Fortune 500 companies for their managers and IT staff.

He is a Disciplined Agile Fellow of the Project Management Institute and a Fellow of the International Association of Software Architects (IASA). In the past he was an Eclipse Process Framework (EPF) committer and a Jolt Judge at the Jolt Awards.

== Work ==
Ambler has co-developed Disciplined Agile Delivery (DAD) with Mark Lines, the Enterprise Unified Process (an extension of the Rational Unified Process), and Agile Modeling.

== See also ==
- Database refactoring

== Publications ==
Scott Ambler has published several books and articles. A selection:

- Ambler, Scott (1995). The Object Primer: the application developer's guide to object-orientation. SIGS Books. ISBN 1-884842-17-8.
- Ambler, Scott (1998). Process Patterns: building large-scale systems using object technology. Cambridge University Press. ISBN 0-521-64568-9.
- Ambler, Scott (2002). Agile Modeling: Effective Practices for EXtreme Programming and the Unified Process. J. Wiley. ISBN 0-471-20282-7.
- Ambler, Scott; Constantine, Larry (2002). The Unified Process Transition and Production Phases. CMP Books. ISBN 1-57820-092-X.
- McGovern, James; Ambler, Scott; Stevens, Mike; Linn, James; Sharan, Vikas; Jo, Elias (2003). The Practical Guide to Enterprise Architecture. Prentice Hall. ISBN 0-13-141275-2.
- Ambler, Scott (2003). Agile Database Techniques: effective strategies for the agile software developer. Wiley Publishing. ISBN 0-471-20283-5.
- Ambler, Scott (2004). The Object Primer 3rd Edition: Agile Model Driven Development with UML 2. Cambridge University Press. ISBN 0-521-54018-6.
- Ambler, Scott; Vizdos, Michael (2005). Enterprise Unified Process: Extending the Rational Unified Process. Prentice Hall PTR. ISBN 0-13-191451-0.
- Ambler, Scott; Sadalage, Pramod J. (2006). Refactoring Databases: Evolutionary Database Design. Addison Wesley Professional. ISBN 0-321-29353-3.
- Ambler, Scott; Lines, Mark (2012). Disciplined Agile Delivery: A Practitioner's Guide to Agile Software Delivery in the Enterprise. IBM press. ISBN 978-0132810135.
- Lines, Mark; Ambler, Scott (2015). Introduction to Disciplined Agile Delivery: A Small Team's Journey from Scrum to Continuous Delivery. Disciplined Agile Consortium. ISBN 978-1497544383.
- Ambler, Scott; Lines, Mark (2017). An Executive Guide to Disciplined Agile: Winning the Race to Business Agility. Disciplined Agile Consortium. ISBN 978-1539852964.
- Lines, Mark; Ambler, Scott (2018). Introduction to Disciplined Agile Delivery 2nd Edition: A Small Team's Journey from Scrum to Disciplined DevOps. Project Management Institute. ISBN 978-1497544383.
- Ambler, Scott; Lines, Mark (2022). Choose Your WoW!: A Disciplined Agile Delivery Handbook for Optimizing Your Way of Working. Project Management Institute. ISBN 978-1628257540.
