= ConceptBase =

All 4 MOF levels for Entity-Relationship Diagrams displayed in the ConceptBase Graph Editor

ConceptBase (a.k.a. ConceptBase.cc) is a deductive and object-oriented database management system developed at University of Skövde. Earlier development was done at University of Passau (1987-1992), University of Aachen (1992-2003), and University of Tilburg (1997-2013). It is mainly used for conceptual modeling and metamodeling in the domain of software engineering and related domains. ConceptBase.cc is free and open-source software.

ConceptBase combines the following features:

- Object-oriented concepts such as classes and inheritance
- Deductive rules evaluated by a Datalog engine
- Active rules conforming to the event condition action (ECA) paradigm
- Recursive function definitions
- Metamodeling with arbitrarily many abstraction levels (metaclasses, meta metaclasses)

ConceptBase implements O-Telos, which is a variant of the knowledge representation Telos.

The graphical user interface consists of a workbench to add new classes & objects and a highly configurable graph editor. The graphical types of nodes and linked can be defined via deductive rules, i.e. they can be context-specific.

== See also ==
- MetaCASE tool
