= Application Implementation Methodology =

Application Implementation Methodology (AIM) is a system framework of related elements. It involves certain tasks, processes, phases and dependencies:

- A task is a unit of work, which results in a single deliverable which may take many different forms like reports, schedules, codes, or test results.
- A process is a closely related to a group of dependent tasks fulfilling a major objective. A process is always based on a common discipline.
- A phase is a chronological grouping or order of tasks. It is a flexible way of organising tasks, preparing schedule major deliverables, and deliver projects
