= MetaDONE =

MetaDONE is a software environment for creating domain-specific modeling languages (DSML). MetaDONE is developed by the PReCISE Research Center of the University of Namur (Belgium). It supports multi-level modeling and is fully bootstrapped. User-defined languages can have several concrete notations that are defined declaratively with the GraSyLa language. This framework proposes several modeling languages (Business Process Model and Notation (BPMN), User Requirements Notation (URN), Goal-oriented Requirements Language (GRL), Petri Net) that can be freely customized by the users.

== See also ==
- Domain-specific modelling (DSM)
