= Don't Make Me Think =

2000 book by Steve Krug

- First edition
- Author: Steve Krug
- Language: English
- Genre: Web Design and Usability
- Published: 2000 New Riders Press
- Publication place: United States
- Pages: 216

Don't Make Me Think is a book by Steve Krug about human–computer interaction and web usability. The book's premise is that a good software program or web site should let users accomplish their intended tasks as easily and directly as possible. Krug points out that people are good at satisficing, or taking the first available solution to their problem, so design should take advantage of this. He frequently cites Amazon.com as an example of a well-designed web site that manages to allow high-quality interaction, even though the web site gets bigger and more complex every day.

The book is intended to exemplify brevity and focus. The goal, according to the book's introduction, was to make a text that could be read by an executive on a two-hour airplane flight.

Originally published in 2000, the book was revised in 2005, and again 2013 to add a section about mobile UX, and has sold more than 700,000 copies.

In 2010, the author published a sequel, Rocket Surgery Made Easy, which explains how anyone working on a web site, mobile app, or desktop software can do their own usability testing to ensure that what they're building will be usable.

The book has been referenced in college courses and online courses on usability.

== Publication history ==
- Krug, Steve (2000). Don't Make Me Think: A Common Sense Approach to Web Usability (1st ed.). New Riders Press (published October 13, 2000). ISBN 978-0-7897-2310-9. OL 8157377M.
- Krug, Steve (2006). Don't Make Me Think: A Common Sense Approach to Web Usability (2nd ed.). New Riders Press. ISBN 978-0-321-34475-5. LCCN 2006277850. OCLC 61895021. OL 15976008M.
- Krug, Steve (2013). Don't Make Me Think, Revisited: A Common Sense Approach to Web Usability (3rd ed.). Pearson Education (published December 24, 2013). ISBN 978-0-321-96551-6. LCCN 2014397947. OCLC 859556499. OL 25650499M.
