= Government Open Code Collaborative =

The U.S. Government Open Code Collaborative or Government Open Code Collaborative Repository was an initiative for best practice exchange among government agencies in the United States employing free software, open source, share alike and other methods of solving software-related problems in an open collaborative way.

Launched in 2004, it was meant to be "a voluntary collaboration between public sector entities and non-profit academic institutions created for the purpose of encouraging the sharing, at no cost, of computer code developed for and by government entities where the redistribution of this code is allowed". Early contributions to the repository were made by the Rhode Island secretary of state's office and the commonwealth of Massachusetts. After two years of activity, no new content has been added to its website since April 2006.

The initiative has been criticized by open source advocates for its failure to embrace open source culture entirely by monitoring access to the code by means of a membership scheme.
