= MetaEdit+ =

- Developer: MetaCase
- Release: November 21, 1995; 30 years ago
- Stable release: 5.6 / November 7, 2025; 12 months ago
- Operating system: Windows, Linux, Mac OS X
- Available in: English
- Type: Model-driven engineering
- License: Commercial software
- Website: www.metacase.com/products.html

MetaEdit+ is an environment for creating and using Domain-Specific Modeling languages.

== Research History ==
The research behind the genesis of MetaEdit+ was carried out at the University of Jyväskylä, as part of the MetaPHOR project. A metamodeling and modeling tool, MetaEdit, had been created by the earlier SYTI project in the late 1980s and early 1990s, in co-operation with a company, MetaCase.

Both MetaEdit and MetaEdit+ were described in a large number of publications from the MetaPHOR research group (including,). Subsequent research has continued to be published as part of ongoing development at MetaCase.

== Tool History ==
MetaEdit allowed graphical metamodeling using Object-Property-Role-Relationship (OPRR) data model, definition of the DSM language notation with a graphical symbol editor, and the definition of code generators using a Domain-Specific Language. These three elements together formed a metamodel file, which configured MetaEdit to support that modeling language.

- MetaEdit 1.0 was released as shareware in 1993.
- MetaEdit 1.1 was released as commercial software in 1993.
- MetaEdit 1.2 was released in 1995.

The original MetaEdit was limited to supporting one modeling language at a time, one user at a time, and one representational paradigm - graphical diagrams. MetaEdit+ was designed to extend this to multiple integrated modeling languages, multiple simultaneous users, and multiple representational paradigms - diagrams, matrices and tables.

- MetaEdit+ 2.0, the first version of MetaEdit+, was released by MetaCase in 1995 for Windows.
- MetaEdit+ 2.5 was released in 1996, adding full multi-user facilities and support for Solaris and HP-UX.
- MetaEdit+ 3.0 was released in 1999, with support for Linux and significant new functionality added in three Service Releases over the next few years.
- MetaEdit+ 4.0 was released in 2004, with new Diagram and Symbol Editors, support for ports, and interoperability via SOAP and XML. Two Service Releases adding new functionality and support for Mac OS X.
- MetaEdit+ 4.5 was released in 2006, adding graphical metamodeling and improving the metamodel, symbol and generator definition facilities and Diagram Editor.
- MetaEdit+ 4.5 SR1a was released in 2009, adding support for newer platforms.
- MetaEdit+ 5.0 was released in December 2012, with Eclipse and Visual Studio integration, dynamic symbols, enhanced graphics, and graphical viewing of changes.
- MetaEdit+ 5.1 was released in November 2014, adding a hierarchical property sheet, movable dynamic ports, and new property types.
- MetaEdit+ 5.5 was released in February 2017, adding versioning and integration with Version Control Systems like Git and SVN. SR1 added project-level access rights.
- MetaEdit+ 5.5 Cloud RSL was released in 2021, adding global collaboration without merge, through remote shared licenses.
- MetaEdit+ 5.6 was released in November 2025, with refactoring and multi-user enhancements for metamodelers, and new search, browsing and filtering functions.

== Work flow ==
There are two main versions of MetaEdit+:

- MetaEdit+ Workbench, including tools for designing and using modeling languages.
- MetaEdit+ Modeler, including tools for using modeling languages.

Normally, MetaEdit+ Workbench is used by a few key developers to design a domain-specific modeling language for their project. Then, this modeling language is used to develop final products using MetaEdit+ Modeler.
