= Environment discipline =

In the Unified Process, "[t]he Environment discipline refers to the tools and customization of the process for the project - that is, setting up the tool and process environment".
