= Steve Krug =

UX professional

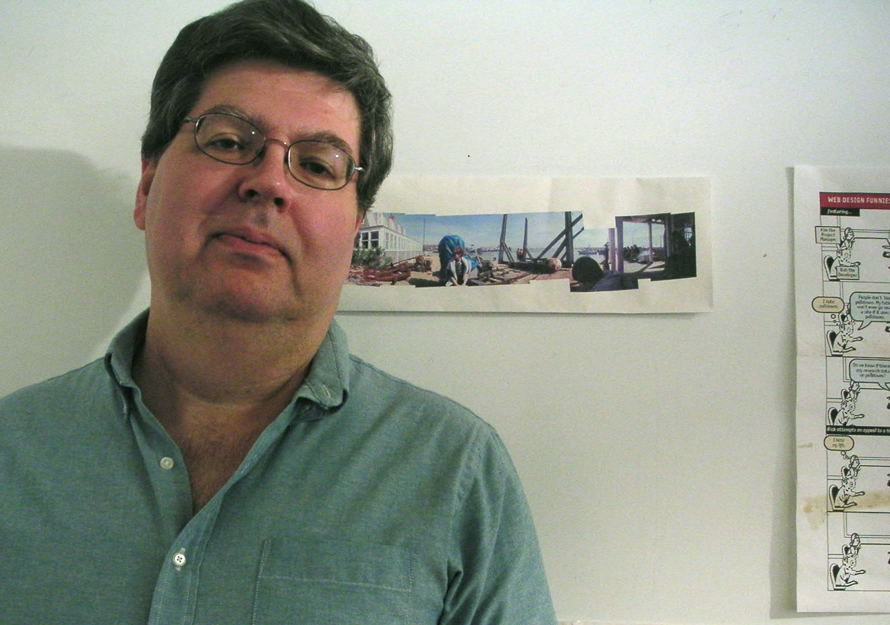
Steve Krug

Steve Krug (born 1950) is a UX (User Experience) professional based in Chestnut Hill, Massachusetts. He is best known for his book Don't Make Me Think about human-computer interaction and web usability, which is in its third edition with over 700,000 copies sold. He also heads a one-man consulting firm called Advanced Common Sense. Krug offers in-house workshops where he teaches do-it-yourself usability testing and provides targeted advice to clients on web usability strategies.

Krug published Rocket Surgery Made Easy: The Do-It-Yourself Guide to Finding and Fixing Usability Problems in 2009.
