= Web usability =

Website usability

Web usability of a website consists of broad goals of usability, presentation of information, choices made in a clear and concise way, a lack of ambiguity and the placement of important items in appropriate areas as well as ensuring that the content works on various devices and browsers.

== Definition and components ==
Web usability includes a small learning curve, easy content exploration, findability, task efficiency, user satisfaction, and automation. These new components of usability are due to the evolution of the Web and personal devices. Examples: automation: auto fill, databases, personal account; efficiency: voice commands (Siri, Alexa, and other artificial intelligence assistants); findability. The number of websites has surpassed 1.5 billion thus increasing the need for well-designed websites that serve their users as best as possible in the constantly more competitive market. With good usability, users can find what they are looking for quickly. With the wide spread of mobile devices and wireless internet access, companies are now able to reach a global market with users of all nationalities at any time and almost any place in the world. It is important for websites to be usable regardless of users' language and culture. Most users in developed countries conduct their personal business online: banking, studying, errands, etc., which has enabled people with disabilities to be independent. Websites also need to be accessible for those users.

The goal of web usability is to provide user experience satisfaction by minimizing the time it takes to the user to learn new functionality and page navigation system, allowing the user to accomplish a task efficiently without major roadblocks, providing the user easy ways to overcome roadblocks, and fixing errors and re-adapting to the website or application system and functionality with minimum effort.

=== ISO approach ===
According to ISO 9241 (Ergonomic Requirements for Office Work with Visual Display Terminals), usability is "the extent to which a product can be used by specified users to achieve specified goals with effectiveness, efficiency and satisfaction in a specified context of use". Therefore, web usability can be defined as the ability of web applications to support web-related tasks with effectiveness, efficiency and satisfaction. Effectiveness represents accuracy and completeness when users achieve a specified goal. Efficiency is resource cost in relation to the accuracy and completeness. Satisfaction is the comfort and acceptability of use.

== Considerations ==
=== Accessibility ===
To attain universal usability for web-based services, designers and developers should take technology variety, user diversity and gaps in user knowledge into consideration. Web usability improvements may include providing a strong contrast mode for people with color vision deficiency.

=== Language ===
Multilingual websites should offer the same experience to the users. UI Alterations because the language and characters used should still provide the different components of usability.

=== Mobile usability ===
With many different mobile devices, it is crucial to consider how the users accomplish their task on a small screen. Web usability components should be appropriate for the mobile device. The users should be awarded with a similar level of satisfaction and accomplishment as if they had used a desktop or laptop.

According to a survey conducted by Google, users want mobile-friendly websites, especially for research. They found that mobile users value short load times, big buttons and readable text, and simple input boxes. Moreover, if a website is mobile friendly, the users are more likely to return, but they will abandon the website if it is not. Google found that the three most sought-after pieces of information for mobile users are locations, opening hours and contact information. Google has also created an online tool called "mobile friendly test" on the Google search console which allows to check mobile-friendliness of a website.

== Criteria ==
=== Nielsen's 10 heuristics ===
Jakob Nielsen's heuristics are widely adopted in interface design. It provides expert reviewers with a set of principles to discover usability problems and then categorize and rate them in a quick way. This set of heuristics includes visibility of system status, match between system and the real world and so on. According to Nielsen, there are 10 general principles:

- Visibility of system status: the users should be informed by a system all the time that people can make better decisions.
- Match between system and the real world: the systems' language should be similar to users' language.
- User control and freedom: It happens many times that users choose the wrong system functions by a mistake, therefore, the system needs to contain the "emergency exit" to give an option for users to leave the unwanted state without any problem.
- Consistency and standards: the users have to be aware that different words, actions and situations can mean the same thing.
- Error prevention: System should have a careful design that can prevent a problem that can occur in the first place.
- Recognition rather than recall: the system should have the actions and options visible so the users do not need to memorize everything from previous steps. Instructions about the system usability should be always visible.
- Flexibility and efficiency of use: the system should have an accelerator to help experienced and inexperienced users to make work faster and easier.
- Aesthetic and minimalist design: the systems needs to contain only relevant and useful information. The information should be clear and short.
- Help users recognize, diagnose, and recover from errors: the error messages should be presented in a clear language and understandable form (no codes), and suggest the solutions.
- Help and documentation: the information about help and documentation should be easy to find and should focus on the users' tasks.

=== Accessibility guidelines ===
The W3C publishes a set of guidelines on Web accessibility called Web Content Accessibility Guidelines (WGAC).

The second revision of WCAG, WCAG 2.0, is composed of twelve guidelines, distilled following the four principles that Web content should adhere to: being Perceivable, Operable, Understandable and Robust.

W3C also provides a detailed checklist for this set of guidelines.

== Understanding usability ==
The concept of usability, particularly in the context of the internet, is most effectively understood from the perspective of the users.

Digital literacy has been growing steadily, leading to a transformation in what Steve Krug highlights "how we really use the internet". Owing to the familiarity and frequency of internet use, users have evolved from reading websites thoroughly to scanning them quickly, often in pursuit of specific information. This shift reflects the efficiency with which users have learned to filter and identify only the information they need, delving deeper only if the initial information doesn't fully meet their requirements.

Moreover, users tend to prioritize satisfactory outcomes over optimal ones when browsing the web, a behavior known as satisficing. This is largely due to the fast-paced nature of internet use and the negligible consequences of incorrect choices, such as clicking a wrong link, which can be easily rectified with a single click of the back button. This lack of penalty for guessing eliminates the need for users to deliberate extensively over which options to select.

As a consequence, most users are less concerned with understanding the underlying mechanics of websites as long as they can effectively navigate and utilize them. However, this behavior can lead to unanticipated thinking patterns and usage methods, which may deviate from the intended functionality of a website.

== Usability testing and improvement ==
As more results of usability research become available, this leads to the development of methodologies for enhancing web usability.

Usability testing is evaluating the different components of web usability (learnability, efficiency, memorability, errors and satisfaction) by watching the users accomplishing their task. Usability testing allows to uncover the roadblocks and errors users encounter while accomplishing a task. However, testing is not a one time event but rather an ongoing process.

== See also ==
- Eye tracking, a fast and accurate usability tool
- Multivariate testing, a statistical testing of user responses
- Web development
- Web navigation
