= Rework =

Rework can refer to:

== Technology ==
- Rework (electronics), the process of removing a component from a printed circuit board and then re-soldering it on
- Rework, the step in the software inspection process during software development when discovered defects are corrected
- Rework, a step in the Fagan inspection process during software development

== Science ==
- Reworked fossil, a fossil that lies in another stratum than the one into which it was originally deposited

== Culture ==
- REWORK (book), a 2010 book by 37signals
- ReWorked, a 2006 remix album by RuPaul
- Body Rework, a remix album by EBM band Nitzer Ebb
