= CatB =

CatB may refer to:

- The Cathedral and the Bazaar, an essay, and later a book, by Eric S. Raymond on software engineering methods
  - Catb.org, the website of Eric S. Raymond
- Cathepsin B, an enzymatic protein
- Catfish and the Bottlemen, a British indie rock band
