= RED OS =

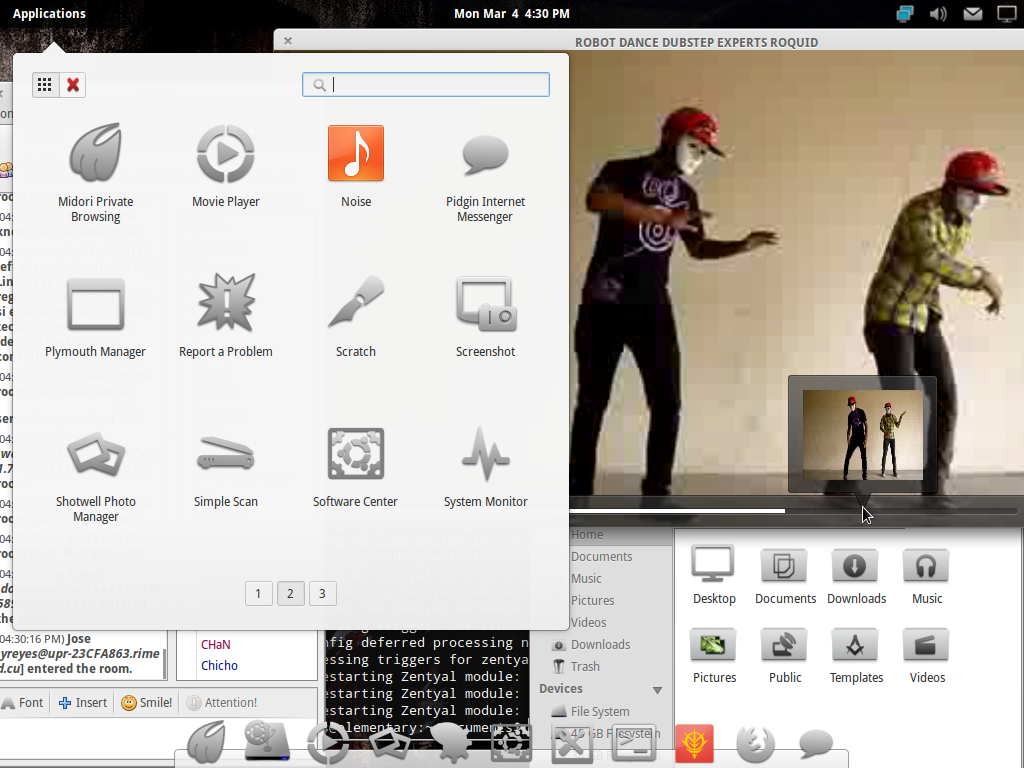
- RED OS
- Developer: Red soft
- OS family: Linux (Unix-like)
- Working state: Active
- Source model: Open source
- Latest release: RED OS 8
- Available in: Multilingual (but installation process in Russian by default; can edit the language at boot of livecd by changing ru_RU to en_US)
- Package manager: RPM
- Supported platforms: AMD64, i586, ARMv7, e2k, AArch64
- Kernel type: Monolithic (Linux kernel)
- Default user interface: Display managers: GDM LightDM Graphical shells: Mate Cinnamon
- Official website: https://redos.red-soft.ru/ Russian

RED OS is a Linux distribution created in Russia, which is a composite product based on open source solutions and proprietary components that have not undergone any independent audits.

It is listed in the Unified Register of Russian Programs. It is certified in the FSTEC certification system of Russia for compliance with the requirements of the Type A operating system protection profile of the fourth IT OS protection class.A4.PZ.

== Development history ==
Red Soft has been developing GNU/Linux distributions since 2012 as part of a government contract with the Federal Bailiff Service of Russia for the Refinement, Development, Implementation and Maintenance of subsystems of the automated information system of the Federal Bailiff Service. In this project, a GosLinux distribution was created with built-in means of protecting unauthorized access information and support for Russian government cryptography, based on CentOS 6, which was a requirement of the FSSP of Russia. A pilot implementation of the developed distribution package in the structural divisions of the federal service began in 2013.

Based on the successful experience of the pilot implementation of GosLinux, in 2014 Red Soft began developing a distribution package under its own name, unrelated to a specific customer — RED OS. According to the developers on the official YouTube channel, when developing the distribution, the experience of the global Open Source communities is used. (RedHat/Fedora, openSUSE, Debian/Ubuntu), At the same time, the current international and Russian standards are strictly observed. (POSIX, LSB and so on.). This is confirmed by the expert council on Russian software of the Ministry of Finance of Russia, consisting of managers.

26 February 2024 — the release of the RED OS distribution version 8 is announced. On 5 May 2025, the release of RED OS 8 for processors with ARM architecture took place.

== Application ==
Today, the RED OS distribution is used in many government agencies of the Russian Federation. For example, in 2018, more than half of the workstations of the Multifunctional Center for the Provision of State and Municipal Services in the Kursk Region were transferred to the RED OS distribution.

At the end of 2019, the Ministry of Labor of the Orenburg Region, as part of the import substitution program, fully completed the transition from Windows. During the transition, the distribution of RED OS was installed on 288 workstations.

On 20 January 2020, it became known that the distribution package would be installed on Huawei Taishan 200 model 2280 servers. This decision was preceded by compatibility testing, after which the companies signed cooperation agreements.

On 23 December 2020, it became known that Rostelecom plans to use the RED OS distribution as its main server system.

At the end of 2020, the Ministry of Health of the Kaliningrad Region procured 930 automated workstations on the Russian state-owned RED OS distribution for medical organizations, which accounted for almost 20% of all medical personnel jobs.

== Editorial offices ==
The state distribution of the ED OS is available in two editions

- The "Standard Edition" is the version of the distribution that contains the most recent and up—to-date versions of packages. It is focused on home use and office environment.
- "Certified edition" — a certified distribution is certified by the FSTEC of Russia and it can be used in government and corporate IP when working with information for which confidentiality requirements are established by law. The current certified version is 7.3 (inspection control was completed in December 2021).

== Configurations ==
The state-owned RED OS distribution comes in two configurations — "workstation" and "server", which have a single repository (for example, for version 7.3).

Basic workstation packages:

- graphical shells MATE, GNOME and KDE Plasma 5;
- office suite LibreOffice;
- mail clients Thunderbird and GNOME Evolution;
- browsers Firefox and Chromium with support for GOST cryptography;
- graphics editors GIMP, Inkscape;
- messengers Pidgin, ekiga, PSI, Vacuum-im;
- terminal access clients OpenNX, Remmina, x2go и freerdp;
- a large set of multimedia software, including both libraries and user applications: audio and video players Audacious, MPlayer, VLC;
- virtualization tools QEMU, VirtualBox
- means of containerization docker, podman.

The server configuration contains packages for all major network services.(DNS, DHCP, SMTP, POP3/IMAP, Samba, IPA, sshd, web servers, etc.), as well as for monitoring and managing the server and computer network (Ansible, Puppet, Cockpit, Webmin, and others).

=== Basic security elements ===
All configurations of the RED OS distribution have standard security features:

- Access-control lists
- Implementation of domains and types;
- Authentication by mechanism PAM;
- An audit subsystem that provides the local administrator with the means to configure the subsystem and take into account critical security events.;
- Availability of a forced access control system SELinux.

== Features ==
The distribution most often contains general developments that are intended for use in Microsoft Windows. Example, the graphical purpose of entering a workstation with remote access to Active Directory, IP, Samba DC domains.

In addition to supporting the solutions available on the market for users to work with crypto media, the Red Soft company has "own developments" in this area.

An example of such an in-house development is RED WINE — an offshoot of the Wine project for improved distribution support for a number of Russian programs written to run in the Microsoft Windows environment. RED WINE allows the use of electronic signature tools by Windows applications in the environment Linux.

== Working with an electronic signature ==
The RED OS distribution is compatible with the main cryptoproviders of the Russian ICI market: CryptoPro CSP from CryptoPro and ViPNet CSP from Infotex.

== System requirements ==
System requirements for the composition of technical means
	Minimal
Processor	x86_64 1.6 GHz 2 cores
RAM	2 GB
Free hard disk space	20 GB
Screen resolution	800 х 600

== See also ==
- ALT Linux
- Astra Linux
- Rosa Linux
