= KeyRus =

- Original author: Dmitry Gurtyak (1971–1998)
- Release: 1989; 37 years ago
- Stable release: 8.0b16 / January 17, 1994; 32 years ago
- Written in: Assembly language
- Operating system: DOS
- Available in: Russian
- Type: DOS driver
- License: freeware
- Website: www.softpanorama.org/People/Gurtyak/

KeyRus was a DOS-based TSR device driver for keyboard and display, written by the Donetsk student and hacker Dmitry Gurtyak in 1989. It was widely distributed in the USSR and outside of the country free of charge. The last version of KeyRus was released in 1994. Gurtyak died in 1998 of a soft tissue sarcoma at 27 years of age.

KeyRus was distributed primarily via electronic bulletin boards and Nikolai Bezroukov's Softpanorama electronic magazine. It loaded fonts into the EGA/VGA and supported changes to be keyboard layout. Initially, it could change only between the Russian and Latin keyboard layouts, but later became more configurable. Its distribution included layout and font editors.

Later versions of KeyRus utilized an original font compression technique - the bitmaps were stored in memory being packed and unpacked just before loading into the graphics adapter. This allowed KeyRus to occupy a minimum of the limited DOS memory space.
