= The Magic Cauldron (essay) =

"The Magic Cauldron" is an essay by Eric S. Raymond on the open-source economic model. It can be read freely online and was published in his 1999 book, The Cathedral and the Bazaar.

== Contents ==
The essay analyzes the economic models that Raymond believes can sustain an open-source project in four steps:

- It first analyzes what the author sees as classical myths about the cost refund in software development and tries to present a game-theory based model of the supposed stability of open-source cooperation.
- Secondly, it presents nine theoretical models that would work for sustainable open-source development: two non-profit, seven for-profit.
- Thirdly it states a theory to decide when it is economically interesting for software to remain closed.
- Finally, it examines some mechanisms that, according to Raymond, the market invented to fund for-profit open-source development (like patronage system and task markets).

== Publication ==
- Raymond, Eric S. (2001). "The Magic Cauldron". The Cathedral and the Bazaar (Paperback ed.). O'Reilly. ISBN 978-0-596-00108-7.
- Raymond, Eric S. (6 November 1999). "The Magic Cauldron".

== See also ==
- Revenge of the Hackers
