= Software implementation =

Software implementation may refer to:

- Software implementation, a specific piece of software together with its features and quality aspects
  - Programming language implementation
- Software construction
  - Computer programming

== See also ==
- Implementation, the realization of something
- Reference implementation, software from which all other implementations are derived
- Software features
- Software quality
