= GNU General Public License =

Series of free software licenses

- Author: Richard Stallman
- Latest version: 3
- Publisher: Free Software Foundation
- Published: 25 February 1989; 37 years ago
- SPDX identifier: GPL-3.0-or-later; GPL-3.0-only; GPL-2.0-or-later; GPL-2.0-only; GPL-1.0-or-later; GPL-1.0-only
- Debian FSG compatible: Yes
- FSF approved: Yes
- OSI approved: Yes (applies to GPLv3-only and GPLv2-only)
- Copyleft: Yes
- Linking from code with a different license: Software licensed under GPL-compatible licenses only, with the exception of the LGPL, which allows all programs.
- Website: www.gnu.org/licenses/gpl.html

The GNU General Public Licenses (GNU GPL or simply GPL) are a series of widely used free software licenses. The GPL is a copyleft license, which means that it guarantees end users the freedom to run, study, share, or modify the software, but if they distribute a derivative work or modification, they must provide the source code to those recipients under the same or equivalent license terms — there is no requirement to publish anything to the public at large. The GPL was the first copyleft license available for general use. It was originally written by Richard Stallman, the founder of the Free Software Foundation (FSF), for the GNU Project. The license grants the recipients of a computer program the rights of the Free Software Definition. The GPL states more obligations on redistribution than the GNU Lesser General Public License and differs significantly from widely used permissive software licenses such as BSD, MIT, and Apache.

Historically, the GPL license family has been one of the most popular software licenses in the free and open-source software (FOSS) domain. Prominent free software programs licensed under the GPL include the Linux kernel and the GNU Compiler Collection (GCC). David A. Wheeler argues that the copyleft provided by the GPL was crucial to the success of Linux-based systems, giving the contributing programmers some assurance that their work would benefit the world and remain free, rather than being potentially exploited by software companies who would not be required to contribute to the community.

In 2007, the third version of the license (GPLv3) was released to address perceived shortcomings in the second version (GPLv2) that had become apparent through long-term use.

To keep the license current, the GPL includes an optional "any later version" clause, which allows users to choose between two options – the original terms, or the terms in new versions as updated by the FSF. Software projects licensed with the optional "or later" clause include the GNU Project, while projects such as the Linux kernel are licensed under GPLv2 only. The "or any later version" clause is sometimes known as a lifeboat clause, since it allows combinations of different versions of GPL-licensed software to maintain compatibility.

Usage of the GPL has steadily declined since the 2010s, particularly because of the complexities mentioned above, as well as a perception that the license restrains the modern open source domain from growth and commercialization.

== History ==
The original GPL was written by Richard Stallman in 1989 for use with programs released as part of the GNU Project. The license was based on unifying similar licenses used for early versions of the GNU Emacs text editor, the GNU Debugger, and the GNU C Compiler. These licenses contained provisions similar to the modern GPL, but they were specific to each program, which rendered them incompatible despite being the same license. Stallman's goal was to produce a single license that could be used for any project, thereby enabling many projects to share code.

The second version of the license, GPLv2, was released in 1991. During the subsequent 15 years, members of the free software community became concerned about specific problems in the GPLv2 license, which could allow a person to exploit GPL-licensed software in ways contrary to the license's intent. These problems included the following:

- tivoization—the inclusion of GPL-licensed software in hardware that prevents users from running modified versions of the software (on that hardware)
- compatibility issues similar to those of the AGPL (v1)
- patent deals between Microsoft and distributors of free and open-source software, which some people viewed as an attempt to use patents as a weapon against the free software community

Version 3 of the GPL was developed as an attempt to address the concerns mentioned above; it was officially released on 29 June 2007.

=== Version 1 ===
GNU General Public License, version 1
- Published: 25 February 1989
- Website: www.gnu.org/licenses/old-licenses/gpl-1.0.html
- Deprecated: Yes

Version 1 of the GNU GPL, released on 25 February 1989, was written to protect against the two main methods by which software distributors restricted the freedoms that define free software.

The first method is publishing binary files that are only executable, but not readable or modifiable by humans. To prevent this restriction, the GPLv1 states that copying and distributing copies of any portion of the program must also make the human-readable source code available under the same licensing terms. (Note: Sections 3a and 3b of the license)

The second method is adding restrictions, either directly to the license or by combining the software with other software having different restrictions on distribution. The union of two such sets of restrictions would apply to the combined work, thereby adding unacceptable constrictions. To prevent this situation, the GPLv1 states that modified versions, as a whole, must be distributed under the terms of GPLv1. (Note: Sections 2b and 4 of the license) As a result, software distributed under the terms of the GPLv1 could be combined with software distributed under more permissive terms, since this combination would not change the terms under which the whole could be distributed. However, software distributed under GPLv1 could not be combined with software distributed under a more restrictive license, since this combination would conflict with the requirement that the whole be distributable under the terms of GPLv1.

=== Version 2 ===
GNU General Public License, version 2
- Published: June 1991
- Website: www.gnu.org/licenses/old-licenses/gpl-2.0.html

According to Richard Stallman, the major change in version 2 of the GPL was the "Liberty or Death" clause—Section 7. The section states that licensees may distribute a GPL-covered work only if they can satisfy all of the license's obligations, despite any other legal obligations they might have. In other words, the obligations of the license may not be severed due to conflicting obligations. This provision is intended to discourage any party from using a patent infringement claim or other litigation to impair users' freedom under the license.

By 1990, it became apparent that a less restrictive license would be strategically useful for two kinds of libraries: the C standard library and software libraries that handled the same tasks as existing proprietary libraries. When the GPLv2 was released in June 1991, a second license was introduced at the same time; this was the GNU Library General Public License (LGPL), numbered as version 2 to show that the two licenses were complementary. The version numbers diverged in 1999 when version 2.1 of the LGPL was released, renamed as the GNU Lesser General Public License to reflect its role in the philosophy. The GPLv2 was updated to refer to the new name of the LGPL, but the GPL's version number remained the same. As a result, the original GPLv2 was not recognized by the Software Package Data Exchange (SPDX).

The GPL includes instructions to specify "version 2 of the License, or (at your option) any later version", to allow the flexible use of either version 2 or 3, but some developers change these instructions to specify "version 2" only.

=== Version 3 ===
GNU General Public License, version 3
- Published: 29 June 2007
- Website: www.gnu.org/licenses/gpl-3.0.html

In late 2005, the Free Software Foundation (FSF) announced work on version 3 of the GPL. On 16 January 2006, the first "discussion draft" of GPLv3 was published, and public consultation began. The official GPLv3 was released by the FSF on 29 June 2007. GPLv3 was written by Richard Stallman, with legal counsel from Eben Moglen and Richard Fontana from the Software Freedom Law Center.

According to Stallman, the most important changes involved software patents, free software license compatibility, the definition of "source code", and hardware restrictions on software modifications (such as tivoization). Other changes involved internationalization, the handling of license violations, and the granting of additional permissions by the copyright holder. The term software propagation was explicitly defined as the copying and duplicating of software.

The public consultation process was coordinated by the Free Software Foundation with assistance from Software Freedom Law Center, Free Software Foundation Europe, and other free software groups. Comments were collected from the public via the gplv3.fsf.org web portal, using purpose-written software called stet. By the end of the comment period, a total of 2,636 comments had been submitted.

The third draft of GPLv3 was released on 28 March 2007. This draft included language intended to prevent patent-related agreements such as the controversial Microsoft-Novell agreement; the draft also restricted the anti-tivoization clauses to legal definitions of "user" and "consumer product". The draft also explicitly removed the section on "Geographical Limitations", the likely removal of this section having been announced at the launch of the public consultation.

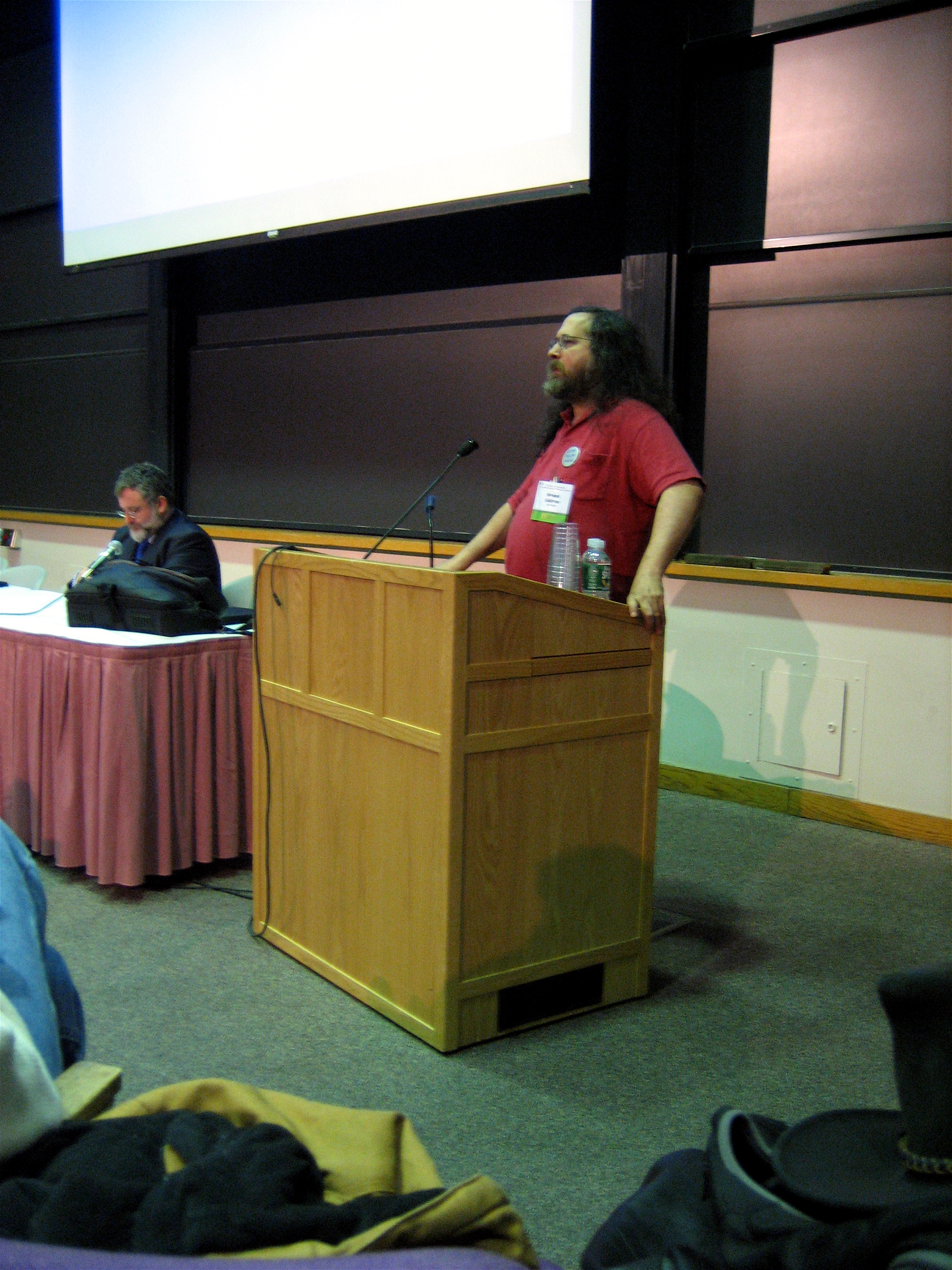
Richard Stallman at the launch of the first draft of the GNU GPLv3 at MIT in Cambridge, Massachusetts, United States. To his right is Columbia University law professor Eben Moglen, chairman of the Software Freedom Law Centre.

The fourth and final discussion draft was released on 31 May 2007. It introduced compatibility with Apache License version 2.0 (since prior versions are incompatible); clarified the role of external contractors; and made an exception to avoid perceived problems with an agreement in the Microsoft–Novell style, stating in Section 11, paragraph 6, as follows:

You may not convey a covered work if you are a party to an arrangement with a third party that is in the business of distributing software, under which you make payment to the third party based on the extent of your activity of conveying the work, and under which the third party grants, to any of the parties who would receive the covered work from you, a discriminatory patent license ...

This exception aimed to make such future deals ineffective. The license was also intended to cause Microsoft to take action—to extend the patent licenses it granted to Novell customers for the use of GPLv3 software to all users of that GPLv3 software; this extension was possible only if Microsoft was legally a "conveyor" of the GPLv3 software.

Early drafts of GPLv3 also let licensors add a requirement similar to the AGPL that would have resolved a loophole in the GPL pertaining to application service providers. The freedom to run, study, and share the source code, as well as guarantee copyleft protections, is somewhat ambiguous in the context of web services. However, concerns were raised about the administrative costs of checking code for the additional requirements proposed in early GPLv3 drafts; it was ultimately decided to keep the GPL and the AGPL separated.

Other respondents—notably high-profile Linux kernel developers such as Linus Torvalds, Greg Kroah-Hartman, and Andrew Morton—used media comments and public statements to object to portions of the GPLv3 drafts. The kernel developers disapproved of clauses about DRM (and tivoization), patents, and "additional restrictions"; in addition, they warned of a "Balkanisation" of the "Open Source Universe". Linus Torvalds, who chose not to adopt the GPLv3 for the Linux kernel, reiterated his criticism several years later.

GPLv3 improved compatibility with several free software licenses, such as the Apache License (version 2.0) and the GNU Affero General Public License (which GPLv2 could not be combined with). However, GPLv3 software could be combined with and share code with GPLv2 software only if two conditions were met: the GPLv2 license that was used contained the optional "or later" clause, and the software was upgraded to GPLv3. While the "GPLv2 or any later version" clause is considered by FSF to be the most common form of licensing GPLv2 software, Toybox developer Rob Landley described it as a lifeboat clause. (Note: "GPLv3 broke "the" GPL into incompatible forks that can't share code....FSF expected universal compliance, but hijacked lifeboat clause when boat wasn't sinking....") Software projects licensed with the optional "or later" clause include Joomla and the GNU Project, while a prominent example without this clause is the Linux kernel.

The final version of the license text for GPLv3 was published on 29 June 2007.

== Terms and conditions ==
The terms and conditions of the GPL must be made available to any person receiving a copy of a work that has a GPL license applied to it ("the licensee"). Any licensee who adheres to the terms and conditions is given permission to modify the work, as well as to copy and redistribute the work or any derivative version. The licensee is allowed to charge a fee for this service or perform this service free of charge. This latter point distinguishes the GPL from software licenses that prohibit commercial redistribution. The FSF asserts that free software should not place restrictions on commercial use, and the GPL explicitly states that GPL works may be sold at any price.

The GPL additionally states that a distributor may not impose "further restrictions on the rights granted by the GPL". This statement forbids activities such as distributing the software under a non-disclosure agreement or contract.

The fourth section of the GPLv2 and the seventh section of the GPLv3 require that programs distributed as pre-compiled binaries be accompanied by one of several things: a copy of the source code; a written offer to distribute the source code via the same mechanism as the pre-compiled binary file; or a written offer to obtain the source code that the user got when they received the pre-compiled binary file under the GPL. The second section of the GPLv2 and the fifth section of the GPLv3 also require distributing the license along with the program. The GPLv3 allows making the source code available in additional ways to satisfy its seventh section. These ways include downloading source code from an adjacent network server and peer-to-peer transmission, provided that the compiled code was available the same way and there are "clear directions" on where to find the source code.

The FSF does not hold the copyright for a work released under the GPL unless an author explicitly assigns copyrights to the FSF; this seldom happens, except for programs that are part of the GNU Project. Only the individual copyright holders have the authority to sue when a license violation is suspected.

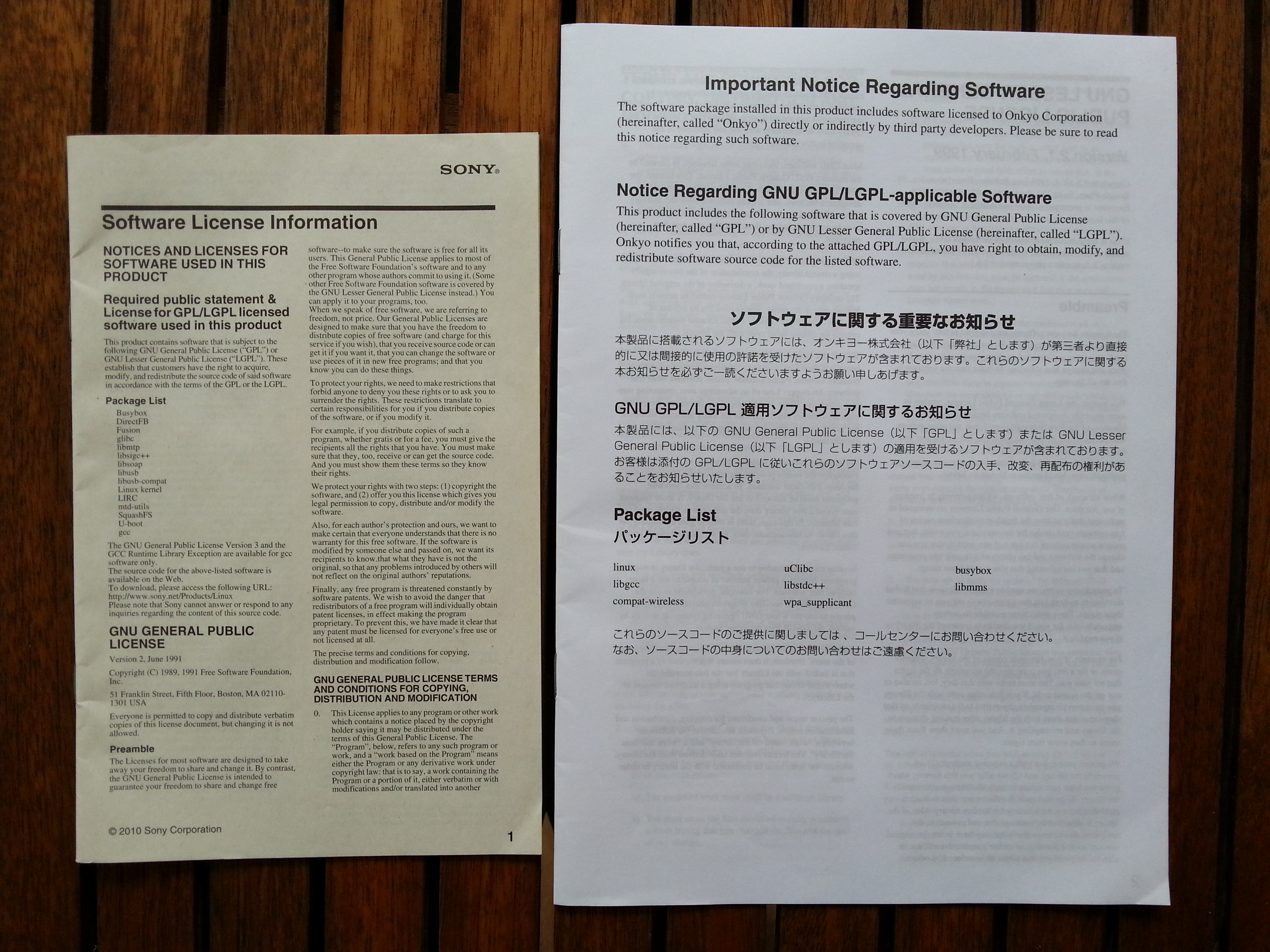
Printed GPL statements for consumer entertainment devices that incorporate GPL components

=== Use of licensed software ===
Software under the GPL may be used for any purposes, including commercial ones, and even as a tool for creating proprietary software, such as when using GPL-licensed compilers. Users or companies who distribute GPL-licensed works (e.g., software), may charge a fee for copies or provide them free of charge. This distinguishes the GPL from two other kinds of license: shareware software licenses that allow copying for personal use but prohibit commercial distribution, and proprietary licenses where copying is prohibited by copyright law. The FSF asserts that freedom-respecting free software should not restrict commercial use and distribution (including redistribution):

In purely private (or internal) use—with no sales and no distribution—the software code may be modified and parts reused without requiring the source code to be released. For sales or distribution, the entire source code needs to be made available to end users, including any code changes and additions—in that case, copyleft is applied to ensure that end users retain the freedoms defined above.

However, software running as an application program under a GPL-licensed operating system (such as Linux) is not required to be licensed under GPL or to be distributed with source-code availability; the licensing depends only on the used libraries and software components, but not on the underlying platform. For example, if a program consists only of original source code, or it is combined with source code from other software components, (Note: Example: if only GNU Lesser General Public License- (LGPL-) libraries, LGPL-software-components and components with permissive free software licenses are used (thus not GPL itself), then only the source code of LGPL parts must be made available—for the developer's own self-developed software components this availability is not required (even when the underlying operating system used is licensed under GPL, as is the case with Linux).) then the custom software components need not be licensed under GPL and need not make their source code available; even if the underlying operating system used is licensed under the GPL, applications running on the system are not considered derivative works. Only if GPL-licensed parts are used in a program (and the program is distributed) must all other source code of the program be made available under the same license terms. The GNU Lesser General Public License (LGPL) was designed to have a weaker copyleft than the GPL, in that the LGPL does not require custom-developed source code (as distinct from the LGPL-licensed parts) to be made available under the same license terms.

The fifth section of the GPLv3 states that no GPL-licensed code shall be considered an effective "technical protection measure" as defined by Article 11 of the WIPO Copyright Treaty, and that those who convey the work waive all legal power to prohibit circumvention of the technical protection measure "to the extent such circumvention is effected by exercising rights under this License with respect to the covered work". This statement means that users cannot be held liable for circumventing DRM implemented in GPLv3-licensed code under laws such as the US Digital Millennium Copyright Act (DMCA).

=== Copyleft ===
The distribution rights granted by the GPL for modified versions of a work are not unconditional. When a person distributes a GPL-licensed work plus their own modifications, the requirements for distributing the whole work cannot be any greater than the requirements in the GPL. This requirement is known as copyleft. It gains its legal power from the use of copyright on software programs.

Because a GPL work is copyrighted, a licensee has no right to redistribute it, except under the terms of the license. A person is only required to adhere to the terms of the GPL if they wish to exercise rights normally restricted by copyright law, such as redistribution. Conversely, if a person distributes copies of the work without abiding by the terms of the GPL (for instance, by keeping the source code secret), they can be sued by the original author under copyright law.

Copyright law has historically been used to prevent distribution of work by parties not authorized by the creator. Copyleft uses the same copyright laws to accomplish a very different goal. Copyleft grants distribution rights to all parties insofar as they provide the same rights to subsequent parties, and these parties to the next parties, and so on. In this way, the GPL and other copyleft licenses attempt to enforce libre access to the work and all derivatives.

Many distributors of GPL-licensed programs bundle the source code with the executables. An alternative way to satisfy the copyleft is giving a written offer to provide the source code on a physical medium (such as a CD) upon request. In practice, many GPL-licensed programs are distributed over the Internet, and the source code is made available via the FTP or HTTP protocol. For Internet distribution, this approach complies with the license.

Copyleft applies only when a person seeks to redistribute the program. Developers may create private modified versions with no obligation to divulge the modifications, as long as they do not distribute the modified software to any other person. Copyleft applies only to the software, but not to its output (unless that output is itself a derivative work of the program). (Note: A counterexample is the GPL licensed GNU Bison: the parsers that it outputs do contain parts of itself and are therefore derivatives, which would fall under the GPL if not for a special exception granted by GNU Bison.) For example, a public web portal running a modified derivative of a GPL-licensed content management system is not required to distribute its changes to the underlying software; this follows because the modified web portal is not being redistributed but rather hosted, and also because the web portal output is not a derivative work of the GPL-licensed content management system.

Some people have debated whether it is a violation of the GPLv1 to release source code in obfuscated form, for example, in cases where the author is less willing to make the source code available. The debate's consensus found such release unethical, but not a violation of the license. The issue was clarified when the GPL was altered in version 2 to require that the "preferred" version of the source code be made available.

=== License versus contract ===
The GPL was designed as a license, rather than a contract. In some common law jurisdictions, the legal distinction between a license and a contract is important: contracts are enforceable by contract law, whereas licenses are enforced under copyright law. However, this distinction is not useful in the many jurisdictions without differences between contracts and licenses, such as civil law systems.

People who decline the GPL's terms and conditions do not have permission, under copyright law, to copy or distribute GPL-licensed software or derivative works. However, if these people do not redistribute the GPL-licensed program, they may still use the software within their organization as they wish, and works (including programs) constructed by using the program need not be covered by this license.

In 2007, software developer Allison Randal argued that the GPLv3 (as a license) is unnecessarily confusing for non-specialist readers, and it could be simplified while retaining the same conditions and legal force.

In April 2017, a US federal court ruled that an open-source license is an enforceable contract.

In October 2021, the Software Freedom Conservancy (as an end user) sued the company Vizio (as a copyright holder) over breach of contract; the goal of the suit was to obtain the source code for Vizio's televisions. A federal judge has ruled in the interim that the GPL is a contract enforceable by end users, as well as a license for copyright holders.

== Derivations ==
The text of the GPL is copyrighted, and the copyright is held by the Free Software Foundation.

The FSF permits people to create new licenses based on the GPL, as long as the derived licenses do not use the GPL preamble without permission. This use is discouraged, however, since such a license might be incompatible with the GPL and causes a perceived license proliferation.

Other licenses created by the GNU Project include the GNU Lesser General Public License, GNU Free Documentation License, and GNU Affero General Public License.

The text of the GPL is not covered by the GPL. The license's copyright disallows modification of the license itself. Copying and distributing the license are allowed, since the GPL requires recipients to receive "a copy of this License along with the Program." According to the GPL FAQ, any person can create a new license using a modified version of the GPL, as long as they meet three conditions: they use a different name for the license; they do not mention "GNU"; and they make their own preamble that is different from the GPL's. However, the preamble can be used in a modified license if permission is obtained from the Free Software Foundation (FSF).

=== GNAT Modified General Public License ===
The GNAT Modified General Public License (short: Modified GPL, GMGPL) is a version of the GNU General Public License specifically modified for compiled units and for the generic feature found in the Ada programming language. The modification is as follows:

As a special exception, if other files instantiate generics from this unit, or you link this unit with other files to produce an executable, this unit does not by itself cause the resulting executable to be covered by the GNU General Public License. This exception does not however invalidate any other reasons why the executable file might be covered by the GNU Public License.

The GNAT Ada compiler can automate conformance checks for some GPL software license issues via a compiler directive. Use pragma License (Modified_GPL); to activate the check against the Modified GPL. The GNAT Reference Manual documents the License pragma along with other compiler directives.

== Linking and derived works ==
=== Libraries ===
According to the FSF, "The GPL does not require you to release your modified version or any part of it. You are free to make modifications and use them privately, without ever releasing them." However, if a person releases a GPL-licensed entity to the public, there is a question about linking—namely, whether a proprietary program that uses a GPL library is in violation of the GPL.

This key issue is whether non-GPL software can statically link or dynamically link to GPL libraries in a legal way. There are different opinions on this issue. The GPL is clear in requiring that all derivative works of code under the GPL must themselves be under the GPL. Ambiguity arises with regard to using GPL libraries and bundling GPL software into a larger package (perhaps mixed into a binary file via static linking).

==== Point of view: dynamic and static linking violate GPL ====
The Free Software Foundation holds the copyright of several notable GPL-licensed software products and of the license text itself. The foundation asserts that an executable that uses a dynamically linked library is indeed a derivative work. This assertion does not, however, apply to separate programs communicating with one another.

The Free Software Foundation also created the LGPL, which is nearly identical to the GPL, but with additional permissions to allow linking for the purposes of "using the library".

Richard Stallman and the FSF specifically encourage library writers to license under the GPL, so that proprietary programs cannot use the libraries, in an effort to protect the free software world by giving it more tools than the proprietary world.

==== Point of view: static linking violates GPL, but unclear about dynamic linking ====
Some people believe that while static linking produces derivative works, it is unclear whether an executable that dynamically links to GPL code should be considered a derivative work (see weak copyleft). Linux author Linus Torvalds agrees that dynamic linking can create derived works, but he disagrees about the circumstances.

A Novell lawyer has written that dynamic linking not being derivative "makes sense" but is not "clear-cut", and that evidence for well-intentioned dynamic linking can be seen in the existence of proprietary Linux kernel drivers.

In the case Galoob v. Nintendo, the United States Ninth Circuit Court of Appeals defined a derivative work as having "'form' or permanence" and noted that "the infringing work must incorporate a portion of the copyrighted work in some form". Nevertheless, no clear court decisions have resolved this particular issue to date.

==== Point of view: linking is irrelevant ====
According to an article in the Linux Journal, Lawrence Rosen (a one-time general counsel for the Open Source Initiative) argues that the method of linking is mostly irrelevant to the question of whether a piece of software is a derivative work; more important is the question of whether the software was intended to interface with client software or libraries. Rosen states, "The primary indication of whether a new program is a derivative work is whether the source code of the original program was used [in a copy-paste sense], modified, translated or otherwise changed in any way to create the new program. If not, then I would argue that it is not a derivative work"; he lists numerous other points about intent, bundling, and linkage mechanism. He further argues on his firm's website that such "market-based" factors are more important than the linking technique.

There is also the specific issue of whether a plugin or module (such as the kernel modules for the NVidia or ATI graphics card) must also be GPL if it could reasonably be considered to be its own work. This point of view suggests that reasonably separate plugins, or plugins for software designed to use plugins, could be licensed under an arbitrary license if the work is GPLv2. Of particular interest is the GPLv2 paragraph:

You may modify your copy or copies of the Program or any portion of it, thus forming a work based on the Program, and copy and distribute such modifications or work under the terms of Section 1 above, provided that you also meet all of these conditions: ...

b) You must cause any work that you distribute or publish, that in whole or in part contains or is derived from the Program or any part thereof, to be licensed as a whole at no charge to all third parties under the terms of this License. ... These requirements apply to the modified work as a whole. If identifiable sections of that work are not derived from the Program and can be reasonably considered independent and separate works in themselves, then this License, and its terms, do not apply to those sections when you distribute them as separate works. But when you distribute the same sections as part of a whole which is a work based on the Program, the distribution of the whole must be on the terms of this License, whose permissions for other licensees extend to the entire whole, and thus to each and every part regardless of who wrote it.

The GPLv3 has a different clause:

You may convey a work based on the Program or the modifications to produce it from the Program, in the form of source code under the terms of Section 4, provided that you also meet all of these conditions: ...

c) You must license the entire work, as a whole, under this License to anyone who comes into possession of a copy. This License will therefore apply, along with any applicable Section 7 additional terms, to the whole of the work, and all its parts, regardless of how they are packaged. This License gives no permission to license the work in any other way, but it does not invalidate such permission if you have separately received it. ... A compilation of a covered work with other separate and independent works, which are not by their nature extensions of the covered work, and which are not combined with it such as to form a larger program, in or on a volume of a storage or distribution medium, is called an "aggregate" if the compilation and its resulting copyright are not used to limit the access or legal rights of the compilation's users beyond what the individual works permit. Inclusion of a covered work in an aggregate does not cause this License to apply to the other parts of the aggregate.

As a case study, some supposedly proprietary plugins and themes (or skins) for a GPLv2 content management system (CMS) have come under fire, with both sides of the debate represented. Examples of these systems include Drupal and WordPress.

The FSF makes a distinction as to how a plugin is invoked. If the plugin is invoked through dynamic linkage, and it makes function calls to a GPL program, then the plugin is most likely a derivative work.

=== Communicating and bundling with non-GPL programs ===
The mere act of communicating with other programs does not, by itself, require all software to be GPL; nor does distributing GPL software with non-GPL software. However, minor conditions must be followed that ensure the rights of GPL software are not restricted. The following is a quotation from the GPL FAQ (at gnu.org), which describes the extent to which software is allowed to communicate with and be bundled with GPL programs:

What is the difference between an "aggregate" and other kinds of "modified versions"?

An "aggregate" consists of a number of separate programs, distributed together on the same CD-ROM or other media. The GPL permits you to create and distribute an aggregate, even when the licenses of the other software are non-free or GPL-incompatible. The only condition is that you cannot release the aggregate under a license that prohibits users from exercising rights that each program's individual license would grant them.

Where's the line between two separate programs, and one program with two parts? This is a legal question, which ultimately judges will decide. We believe that a proper criterion depends both on the mechanism of communication (exec, pipes, rpc, function calls within a shared address space, etc.) and the semantics of the communication (what kinds of information are interchanged).

If the modules are included in the same executable file, they are definitely combined in one program. If modules are designed to run linked together in a shared address space, that almost surely means combining them into one program.

By contrast, pipes, sockets, and command-line arguments are communication mechanisms normally used between two separate programs. So when they are used for communication, the modules normally are separate programs. But if the semantics of the communication are intimate enough, exchanging complex internal data structures, that too could be a basis to consider the two parts as combined into a larger program.

The FSF thus draws a line between "library" and "other program" via two aspects of the situation: the "complexity" and "intimacy" of information exchange, and the mechanism (rather than the semantics). But the foundation concedes that the question is not clear-cut, and case law will determine the outcome in complex situations.

== Legal status ==
The first known violation of the GPL occurred in 1989, when the company NeXT extended the GCC compiler to support Objective-C, but did not publicly release the changes. After an inquiry, the company created a public patch file. No lawsuit was filed over this violation.

In 2002, MySQL AB sued the company Progress NuSphere for copyright and trademark infringement in US federal court. NuSphere had allegedly violated MySQL's copyright by linking MySQL's GPL-licensed code with the NuSphere Gemini table without complying with the license. After a preliminary hearing on 27 February 2002, the parties entered settlement talks and eventually settled. (Note: See Progress Software Corporation v. MySQL AB, 195 F. Supp. 2d 328 (D. Mass. 2002), on the defendant's motion for a preliminary injunction.) After the hearing, FSF commented that the judge "made clear that she sees the GNU GPL to be an enforceable and binding license."

In August 2003, the SCO Group stated that they believed the GPL to have no legal validity, and that they intended to pursue lawsuits over sections of code supposedly copied from SCO Unix into the Linux kernel. This was a problematic stand for SCO, as they had distributed Linux and other GPL-licensed code in their Caldera OpenLinux distribution, and there is little evidence that they had any legal right to do so except under the terms of the GPL. In February 2018, after a federal circuit court judgment, appeal, and partial remanding to the circuit court, the parties restated their remaining claims and provided a plan to move toward final judgement. The remaining claims revolved around Project Monterey, and they were settled in November 2021 by IBM paying $14.25 million to the TSG (previously SCO) bankruptcy trustee.

In April 2004, the netfilter/iptables project was granted a preliminary injunction against Sitecom Germany by Munich District Court, after Sitecom refused to desist from distributing Netfilter's GPL-licensed software in violation of the terms of the GPL. Harald Welte of Netfilter was represented by Till Jaeger, co-founder of the Institut für Rechtsfragen der Freien und Open Source Software (ifrOSS, or "Institute for legal issues regarding free and open source software" in English). In July 2004, the German court confirmed this injunction as a final ruling against Sitecom. The court's justification was that:

Defendant has infringed on the copyright of the plaintiff by offering the software 'netfilter/iptables' for download and by advertising its distribution, without adhering to the license conditions of the GPL. Said actions would only be permissible if the defendant had a license grant. ... This is independent of the questions whether the licensing conditions of the GPL have been effectively agreed upon between plaintiff and defendant or not. If the GPL were not agreed upon by the parties, defendant would notwithstanding lack the necessary rights to copy, distribute, and make the software 'netfilter/iptables' publicly available.

This ruling mirrored the predictions given previously by the FSF's Eben Moglen. The ruling was important for two reasons: it was the first confirmation by a court that violating terms of the GPL could be a copyright violation, and it established jurisprudence as to the enforceability of the GPLv2 under German law.

In May 2005, Daniel Wallace filed suit against the Free Software Foundation in the Southern District of Indiana, contending that the GPL is an illegal attempt to fix prices (at zero). The suit was dismissed in March 2006, on the grounds that Wallace had failed to state a valid antitrust claim; the court noted that "the GPL encourages, rather than discourages, free competition and the distribution of computer operating systems, the benefits of which directly pass to consumers". Wallace was denied the possibility of further amending his complaint, and he was ordered to pay the FSF's legal expenses.

On 8 September 2005, the Seoul Central District Court ruled that the GPL was not material to a case dealing with trade secrets derived from GPL-licensed work. Defendants argued that since it is impossible to maintain trade secrets while complying with GPL and distributing the work, they are not in breach of trade secrets. This argument was considered to be without ground.

On 6 September 2006, the gpl-violations.org project prevailed in court litigation against D-Link Germany GmbH, with regard to D-Link's copyright-infringing use of parts of the Linux kernel in storage devices that they distributed. The judgment stated that the GPL is valid, legally binding, and stands in a German court.

In late 2007, BusyBox developers and the Software Freedom Law Center embarked upon a program to gain GPL compliance from distributors of BusyBox in embedded systems, suing distributors who would not comply. These lawsuits were claimed to be the first US uses of courts for enforcement of GPL obligations (see BusyBox GPL lawsuits).

On 11 December 2008, the Free Software Foundation sued Cisco Systems, Inc. for copyright violations by its Linksys division; these concerned the FSF's GPL-licensed coreutils, readline, Parted, Wget, GNU Compiler Collection, binutils, and GNU Debugger software packages. Linksys distributes these packages in the Linux firmware of its WRT54G wireless routers, as well as numerous other devices. These devices include DSL and Cable modems, Network Attached Storage devices, Voice-over-IP gateways, virtual private network devices, and a home theater (or media player) device.

The FSF took Cisco to court after six years of multiple issues:

- Repeated complaints to Cisco by the FSF
- Claims by Cisco that they would correct, or were correcting, their compliance problems (i.e., not providing complete copies of all source code and its modifications)
- Repeated new violations being discovered and reported with more products
- Lack of action by Linksys, a process described on the FSF blog as a "five-years-running game of Whack-a-Mole"

Cisco settled the case six months later by agreeing to several actions:

- "appoint a Free Software Director for Linksys" to ensure compliance
- "notify previous recipients of Linksys products containing FSF programs of their rights under the GPL"
- make source code of FSF programs freely available on its website
- make a monetary contribution to the FSF

In 2011, it was noticed that GNU Emacs had been accidentally releasing some binary files without corresponding source code for two years, contrary to the intended spirit of the GPL, resulting in a copyright violation. Richard Stallman described this incident as a "very bad mistake", which was promptly fixed. The FSF did not sue any downstream redistributors who inadvertently violated the GPL by distributing these binary files.

In 2017 Artifex, the maker of the Ghostscript interpreter, sued Hancom, the maker of an office suite that included Ghostscript. Artifex offers two licenses for Ghostscript: one is the AGPL License, and the other is a commercial license. Hancom did not acquire a commercial license from Artifex, nor did it release its office suite as free software. Artifex sued Hancom in US District Court and made two claims: first, Hancom's use of Ghostscript was a violation of copyright; second, Hancom's use of Ghostscript was a license violation. The court found that the GPL license was an enforceable contract and that Hancom was in breach of contract.

On 20 July 2021, the developers of the open-source Stockfish chess engine sued ChessBase, a creator of chess software, for violating the GPLv3 license. Stockfish's creators claimed that ChessBase had made only minor modifications to the Stockfish code and sold the new chess engines (Fat Fritz 2 and Houdini 6) to their customers. Additionally, Fat Fritz 2 was marketed as though an innovative chess engine. In Stockfish's view, ChessBase had infringed on the license by not distributing these products as free software in accordance with the GPL.

A year later, on 7 November 2022, the parties reached an agreement and ended the dispute. In the near future, ChessBase would no longer sell products containing Stockfish code, while informing their customers of this change through an appropriate notice on the company's web pages. However, one year later, ChessBase's license would then be reinstated. Stockfish did not seek damages or financial compensation.

== Compatibility and multi-licensing ==
Quick guide to license compatibility with GPLv3 according to the FSF. A dashed line indicates that the GPLv2 is only compatible with GPLv3 with the clause "or any later version".

Code licensed under several other licenses can be combined with a program under the GPL without conflict, as long as the combination of restrictions on the work as a whole does not put any additional restrictions beyond what GPL allows. In addition to the regular terms of the GPL, there are additional restrictions and permissions that can be applied:

1. If a user wants to combine code licensed under different versions of GPL, then this combination is allowed only if the code with the earlier GPL version includes the statement "or any later version". For instance, the GPLv3-licensed GNU LibreDWG library cannot be used by LibreCAD and FreeCAD who have GPLv2-only dependencies.
2. Code licensed under LGPL is permitted to be linked with any other code regardless of that code's license, though the LGPL does add additional requirements for the combined work. LGPLv3 and GPLv2-only can thus typically not be linked, since the combined code work would add additional LGPLv3 requirements on top of the GPLv2-only licensed software. Code licensed under LGPLv2.x without the statement "any later version" can be relicensed if the whole combined work is licensed under GPLv2 or GPLv3.

FSF maintains a list of GPL-compatible free software licenses containing many of the most common licenses, such as the original MIT/X license, the BSD license (in its current 3-clause form), and the Artistic License 2.0.

Starting with GPLv3, certain materials are unilaterally compatible with other materials: materials (such as text and other media) under Creative Commons Attribution-ShareAlike 4.0 International License can be remixed into GPL-licensed materials (predominantly software), not vice versa, for niche use cases such as game engines (under GPL) with game scripts (under CC BY-SA).

David A. Wheeler has advocated that free (or open source) software developers use only GPL-compatible licenses, because using other licenses makes it difficult for other people to participate and contribute code. As a specific example of license incompatibility, Sun Microsystems' ZFS file system cannot be included in the GPL-licensed Linux kernel, because it is licensed under the GPL-incompatible Common Development and Distribution License. Furthermore, ZFS is protected by patents, so distributing an independently developed implementation made compatible with GPL would still require Oracle's permission.

A number of businesses use multi-licensing to distribute a GPL version and sell a proprietary license to companies wishing to combine the package with proprietary code (whether using static or dynamic linking). Examples of such companies include MySQL AB, Digia PLC (with Qt framework, before 2011 from Nokia), Red Hat (with Cygwin), and Riverbank Computing (with PyQt). Other organizations, such as the Mozilla Foundation (whose products include Mozilla Application Suite, Mozilla Thunderbird, and Mozilla Firefox), used multi-licensing to distribute versions under the GPL and other open-source licenses.

== Text and other media ==
It is possible to use the GPL for text documents (or more generally for any kind of media) if it is clear what constitutes the source code, which is defined as "the preferred form of the work for making changes in it". For manuals and textbooks, though, the FSF recommends using the GNU Free Documentation License (GFDL) instead, which the foundation created for this purpose. Nevertheless, in a resolution adopted in 2006, Debian developers recommended licensing documentation for their project under the GPL, because the GFDL was incompatible with the GPL. That is, text licensed under the GFDL cannot be incorporated into GPL software. Similarly, the FLOSS Manuals foundation, dedicated to creating manuals for free software, chose in 2007 to eschew the GFDL in favor of the GPL for its texts.

If the GPL is used for computer fonts, any documents or images made with these fonts might also need to be distributed under the terms of the GPL. This dependency does not apply in countries that recognize typefaces (i.e., the appearance of fonts) as being useful articles and thus not eligible for copyright, but rather font files as copyrighted computer software. This situation can complicate font embedding, since a document could be considered 'linked' to its font; in other words, embedding a vector font in a document could force the document to be released under the GPL, but a rasterized rendering of the font would not be subject to the GPL. The FSF provides the GPL font exception for cases where this dependency is not desired.

== Adoption ==
Historically, the GPL family has been one of the most popular software licenses in the FOSS domain.

A 1997 survey of MetaLab, then the largest free software archive, showed that the GPL accounted for about half of the software licensed there. Similarly, a 2000 survey of Red Hat Linux 7.1 found that 53% of the source code was licensed under the GPL. As of 2003, a significant share of the projects listed on SourceForge.net were from the GPL family—about 68% of all projects listed, and 82.1% of the licensed projects that were open source industry certified. As of August 2008, the GPL family accounted for 70.9% of the 44,927 free software projects listed on Freecode.

After the GPLv3 was released in June 2007, adoption of this new license version was widely discussed, and some projects decided against upgrading. For instance, the Linux kernel, MySQL, BusyBox, AdvFS, Blender, VLC media player, and MediaWiki decided against adopting GPLv3. Still, two years after the release of GPLv3, Google open-source programs office manager Chris DiBona reported as follows: 50% of GPL-licensed open-source projects had moved from GPLv2 to GPLv3, counting the projects that were hosted at the service Google Code.

In 2011, four years after the release of the GPLv3, 6.5% of all open-source license projects were GPLv3 while 42.5% were GPLv2, according to data from Black Duck Software. Later in 2011, analyst Matthew Aslett from the company 451 Group asserted in a blog post that copyleft licenses had gone into decline and permissive licenses increased, based on statistics from Black Duck Software. Similarly, in February 2012, Jon Buys reported that among the top 50 projects on the platform GitHub, only five projects were under a GPL license, including dual-licensed and AGPL projects.

GPL usage statistics from 2009 to 2013 were extracted from data on the Freecode website by Walter van Holst while analyzing license proliferation:

Usage of GPL family licenses by % on Freecode
2009	2010	2011	2012	2013	18 June 2014
72%	63%	61%	59%	58%	approx. 54%

In August 2013, according to Black Duck Software, their website's data showed that the GPL license family was used by 54% of open-source projects, with a breakdown of the individual licenses as shown in the table below. However, a study later in 2013 showed that software licensed under the GPL license family had actually increased, and that even the data from Black Duck Software had shown a total increase in software projects licensed under GPL. The later study used public information gathered from repositories of the Debian Project, and this study criticized Black Duck Software for not publishing the methodology used in collecting their statistics. Daniel German, professor in the Department of Computer Science at the University of Victoria in Canada, gave a talk in 2013 on methodological challenges in determining which free software licenses are most widely used, and he showed that he could not replicate the result from Black Duck Software.

In 2015, according to Black Duck, GPLv2 had lost its first-place position to the MIT license and was now in second place; and the GPLv3 had dropped to fourth place, while the Apache license had kept third place.

Usage of GPL family licenses in the FOSS domain by %, according to Black Duck Software
License	8 May 2008	11 March 2009	22 November 2011	12 August 2013	19 November 2015	6 June 2016	2 January 2017	4 June 2018
GPLv2	58.69%	52.2%	42.5%	33%	23%	21%	19%	14%
GPLv3	1.64%	4.15%	6.5%	12%	9%	9%	8%	6%
LGPLv2.1	11.39%	9.84%	?	6%	5%	4%	4%	3%
LGPLv3	? (<0.64%)	0.37%	?	3%	2%	2%	2%	1%
GPL family combined	71.72% (+ <0.64%)	66.56%	?	54%	39%	36%	33%	24%

In March 2015, an analysis of the repositories on GitHub revealed that approximately 25% of licensed projects used the GPL license family. In June 2016, an analysis of the Fedora Project community's packages revealed the GNU GPLv2 or later as the most popular license, and the GNU GPL family as the most popular license family (followed by the MIT, BSD, and GNU LGPL families).

In April 2018, whitesourcesoftware.com analyzed the FOSS ecosystem; their results showed the GPLv3 to be third place (18%) and the GPLv2 in fourth place (11%), after the MIT license (26%) and the Apache 2.0 license (21%).

== Reception ==
=== Legal barrier to application stores ===
The GPL is incompatible with many systems for the digital distribution of applications, such as the Mac App Store and certain other software distribution platforms (on smartphones and PCs). The problem lies in the right "to make a copy for your neighbour", since this right is violated by digital-rights management (DRM) systems that are embedded in the platform to prevent copying of paid software. Even if the application is free in the application store in question, copying might result in a violation of that application store's terms.

There is a distinction between an app store, which sells DRM-restricted software under proprietary licenses, and the more general concept of digital distribution via some form of online software repository. Virtually all modern Unix systems and Linux distributions have application repositories, including NetBSD, FreeBSD, Ubuntu, Fedora, and Debian. These specific application repositories all contain GPL-licensed software apps, in some cases even when the core project does not permit GPL-licensed code in the base system (for instance, OpenBSD). In other cases, such as the Ubuntu App Store, proprietary commercial software applications and GPL-licensed applications are both available via the same system. The Mac App Store (along with similar projects) is not incompatible with GPL-licensed apps for reasons inherent in the concept of an app store; rather, the incompatibility is due specifically to Apple's terms-of-use requirement—that all apps in the store utilize Apple DRM restrictions. By contrast, Ubuntu's app store does not have such a requirement: "These terms do not limit or restrict your rights under any applicable open source software licenses."

=== Microsoft ===
In 2001, Microsoft CEO Steve Ballmer referred to Linux as "a cancer that attaches itself in an intellectual property sense to everything it touches". In response to Microsoft's attacks on the GPL, several prominent Free Software developers and advocates released a joint statement supporting the license. Microsoft released Microsoft Windows Services for UNIX, which contains GPL-licensed code. In July 2009, Microsoft released a body of about 20,000 lines of Linux driver code under the GPL. The Hyper-V hypervisor code in this release used open-source components licensed under the GPL; this code was originally statically linked to proprietary binary parts, the latter not being permitted in GPL-licensed software.

==== "Viral" nature ====
The description of the GPL as "viral", when called "General Public Virus" or "GNU Public Virus" (GPV), dates back to the year after the GPLv1 was released.

In 2001, the term received broader public attention when Craig Mundie, a Senior Vice President at Microsoft, described the GPL as being "viral". Mundie argues that the GPL has a "viral" effect, in that it only allows the conveyance of whole programs; this implies that programs which link to GPL libraries must themselves be under a GPL-compatible license, otherwise they cannot be combined and distributed.

In a 2006 interview, Richard Stallman responded that Mundie's metaphor of a "virus" is incorrect, as software under the GPL does not "attack" or "infect" other software. Accordingly, Stallman believes that comparing the GPL to a virus is inappropriate, and that a better metaphor for software under the GPL would be a spider plant: if a person takes a piece of this plant and places it somewhere else, it grows there too.

Nevertheless, the concept of the GPL's viral nature was later adopted by other people. For instance, a 2008 article stated that "The GPL license is 'viral,' meaning any derivative work you create containing even the smallest portion of the previously GPL-licensed software must also be licensed under the GPL license."

=== Barrier to commercialization ===
The FreeBSD project has stated that "a less publicized and unintended use of the GPL is that it is very favorable to large companies that want to undercut software companies. In other words, the GPL is well suited for use as a marketing weapon, potentially reducing overall economic benefit and contributing to monopolistic behavior". The project also stated that the GPL can "present a real problem for those wishing to commercialize and profit from software."

Richard Stallman wrote about an example of ethically acceptable commercialization practice—the practice of selling exceptions to free software licenses. This practice implies that the copyright holder of a given software takes two steps:

- Releases the software (along with the corresponding source code) to the public under a free software license
- "[T]hen lets customers pay for permission to use the same code under different terms, for instance allowing its inclusion in proprietary applications"

Stallman considered the practice of selling exceptions to be "acceptable since the 1990s, and on occasion I've suggested it to companies. Sometimes this approach has made it possible for important programs to become free software". Although the FSF does not practice selling exceptions, they propose a comparison with the X11 license (a non-copyleft free software license) as a way of suggesting that this commercialization technique be regarded as ethically acceptable. Releasing a given program under a non-copyleft free software license would permit embedding the code in proprietary software. Stallman comments that "either we have to conclude that it's wrong to release anything under the X11 license—a conclusion I find unacceptably extreme—or reject this implication. Using a non-copyleft license is weak, and usually an inferior choice, but it's not wrong. In other words, selling exceptions permits some embedding in proprietary software, and the X11 license permits even more embedding. If this doesn't make the X11 license unacceptable, it doesn't make selling exceptions unacceptable".

=== Criticism of open-source ===
In 2000, developer and author Nikolai Bezroukov published an analysis and comprehensive critique of GPL's foundations and Stallman's software development model, called "Labyrinth of Software Freedom".

As a parody of the GPL, version 2 of the Do What The Fuck You Want To Public License (WTFPL) was created by Debian project leader Sam Hocevar in 2004.

In 2005, open source software advocate Eric S. Raymond questioned the relevance of GPL at that time for the FOSS ecosystem, stating that "We don't need the GPL anymore. It's based on the belief that open source software is weak and needs to be protected. Open source would be succeeding faster if the GPL didn't make lots of people nervous about adopting it." Richard Stallman replied that "GPL is designed to ... ensure that every user of a program gets the essential freedoms—to run it, to study and change the source code, to redistribute copies, and to publish modified versions ... [Raymond] addresses the issue in terms of different goals and values—those of 'open source,' which do not include defending software users' freedom to share and change software."

In 2007, Allison Randal, who took part in the GPL draft committee, criticized GPLv3 for being incompatible with the GPLv2 and for lacking clarity in its formulation. Similarly that year, William Hurley (a.k.a. Whurly) foresaw the decline of the GPL due to its lack of focus on developers with GPLv3, which would encourage them to move toward permissive licenses.

In a 2009 article at the InformIT website, David Chisnall described "The Failure of the GPL"—problems such as its incompatibility and the complexity of its license text.

In 2014, developer and executive Bryan Cantrill termed the copyleft GPL a "Corporate Open Source Anti-pattern" for being "anti-collaborative"; he recommended permissive software licenses instead.

=== Criticism of GPLv3 ===
In September 2006, during the draft process of the GPLv3, several high-profile developers of the Linux kernel—such as Linus Torvalds, Greg Kroah-Hartman, and Andrew Morton—warned of a split in the FOSS community: "the release of GPLv3 portends the Balkanisation of the entire Open Source Universe upon which we rely." Similarly, Benjamin Mako Hill argued around the same time that a united, collaborating community is more important than a single license.

After the GPLv3 was released in 2007, some journalists and Toybox developer Rob Landley criticized the release: with the introduction of the GPLv3, the division between the open source and free software communities had widened, because the significantly extended GPLv3 is essentially incompatible with the GPLv2. Compatibility is only provided under the optional "or later" clause of the GPL; this option which was not pursued by the Linux kernel, among other software. Before the release of GPLv3, Bruce Byfield noted, GPLv2 was a unifying element between the open-source and the free software communities.

For the LGPLv3, GNU TLS maintainer Nikos Mavrogiannopoulos similarly argued, "If we assume that [the LGPLv3's] primary goal is to be used by free software, then it blatantly fails that"; this statement was made after Mavrogiannopoulos changed the license of the GnuTLS library from LGPLv3 back to LGPLv2.1, due to license compatibility issues.

In 2007, Lawrence Rosen, attorney and computer specialist, praised how the community using the Apache license could then collaborate with the GPL community in a compatible way, since the problems of GPLv2 compatibility with Apache licensed software had been resolved by the GPLv3. Along these lines, he said that "I predict that one of the biggest success stories of GPLv3 will be the realization that the entire universe of free and open-source software can thus be combined into comprehensive open source solutions for customers worldwide."

In July 2013, Armin Ronacher (creator of the Flask framework) drew a less optimistic conclusion about GPL compatibility in the FOSS ecosystem: "When the GPL is involved the complexities of licensing becomes a non fun version of a riddle"; he also noted that the conflict between Apache License 2.0 and GPLv2 still had an impact on the ecosystem.

== See also ==
- Criticism of copyright
- Multi-licensing
- European Union Public Licence (EUPL)
- GNU Lesser General Public License (LGPL)
- GNU Affero General Public License (AGPL)
- GPL font exception
- GPL linking exception
- Comparison of free and open-source software licenses
- Free-software license
- Category:Software using the GNU General Public License
- Public information licence
