= Technical peer review =

In engineering, technical peer review is a well defined review process for finding and correcting defects conducted by a team of peers with assigned roles. Technical peer reviews are carried out by peers representing areas of life cycle affected by material being reviewed (usually limited to 6 or fewer people). Technical peer reviews are held within development phases, between milestone reviews, on completed products, or on completed portions of products. A technical peer review may also be called an engineering peer review, a product peer review, a peer review/inspection or an inspection.

== Overview ==
The purpose of a technical peer review is to remove defects as early as possible in the development process. By removing defects at their origin (e.g., requirements and design documents, test plans and procedures, software code, etc.), technical peer reviews prevent defects from propagating through multiple phases and work products and reduce the overall amount of rework necessary on projects. Improved team efficiency is a side effect (e.g., by improving team communication, integrating the viewpoints of various engineering specialty disciplines, more quickly bringing new members up to speed, and educating project members about effective development practices).

In CMMI, peer reviews are used as a principal means of verification in the Verification process area and as an objective evaluation method in the Process and Product Quality Assurance process area. The results of technical peer reviews can be reported at milestone reviews.

Peer reviews are distinct from management reviews, which are conducted by management representatives rather than by colleagues and for management and control purposes rather than for technical evaluation. This is especially true of line managers of the author or other participants in the review. A policy of encouraging management to stay out of peer reviews encourages the peer review team to concentrate on the product being reviewed and not on the people or personalities involved.

They are also distinct from software audit reviews, which are conducted by personnel external to the project, to evaluate compliance with specifications, standards, contractual agreements, or other criteria. A software peer review is a type of technical peer review. The IEEE defines formal structures, roles, and processes for software peer reviews.

== Roles of participants ==
Moderator
Responsible for conducting the technical peer review process and collecting inspection data. The moderator plays a key role in all stages of the process except rework and is typically required to perform several duties during a technical peer review in addition to inspectors' tasks.

Inspectors
Responsible for finding defects in work product from a general point of view, as well as defects that affect their area of expertise.

Author
Provides information about work product during all stages of process. The author is responsible for correcting all major defects and any minor and trivial defects that cost and schedule permit, as well as performing the duties of an inspector.

Reader
Guides team through work product during the technical peer review meeting. The reader reads or paraphrases work product in detail and also may perform the duties of an inspector.

Recorder
Accurately records each defect found during inspection meeting on the Inspection Defect List, and may also perform the duties of an inspector.

== Vested interest of reviewers ==
There are two philosophies about the vested interest of the inspectors in the product under review. On one hand, project personnel who have a vested interest in the work product under review have the most knowledge of the product and are motivated to find and fix defects. On the other hand, personnel from outside the project who do not have a vested interest in the work product bring objectivity and a fresh viewpoint to the technical peer review team.

Each inspector is invited to disclose vested interests to the rest of the technical peer review panel so the moderator can exercise sound judgement in evaluating the inspector's inputs.
