= Public information licence =

The freely reusable public information licence (French:Licence information publique librement réutilisable or LIP) is a public copyright license, created 2 April 2010, that permits the free and open reuse, commercially or not, of information released by a French public institution, on condition of respecting article 12 of the law of 17 July 1978. Not all French public sector information is placed under this license; Anne Fauconnier of the state intellectual property agency specifies that this LIP is and remains strictly reserved to certain information published by the Ministry of Justice (France).

== Description ==
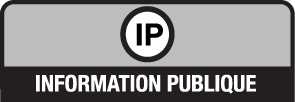
Licence "information publique librement réutilisable"

The logo of this licence strongly resembles those of Creative Commons licences since it is arranged according to the terms of the CC-by-sa 2.0 licence. It is more strict, though, in that it requires a documents' "meaning be not transformed, and that their sources and their update dates be mentioned", which makes it closer to the Creative Commons No-Derivatives License, rather than the Share-Alike License.

== See also ==
- Creative Commons Licence
- GNU General Public Licence
- Law of France
