= Fan-out (software) =

Term used in software engineering

Fan-out has multiple meanings in software engineering.

== Message-oriented middleware ==
In message-oriented middleware solutions, fan-out is a messaging pattern used to model an information exchange that implies the delivery (or spreading) of a message to one or multiple destinations possibly in parallel, and not halting the process that executes the messaging to wait for any response to that message.

== Software design and quality assurance ==
In software construction, the fan-out of a class or method is the number of other classes used by that class or the number of other methods called by that method.

Additionally, fan-out has impact on the quality of a software.

== See also ==
- Middleware
- Coupling (computer programming)
- Software quality
- Software metric
