= Nikolai Bezroukov =

American internet security analyst

Nikolai Bezroukov is a Senior Internet Security Analyst at BASF Corporation and was member of Computer Science at Fairleigh Dickinson University (New Jersey, United States). Also Webmaster of Open Source Software University, a volunteer technical site for the United Nations Sustainable Development Networking Programme (SDNP) that helps with Internet connectivity and distributes Linux to developing countries.

== Early career ==
=== Softpanorama ===
From 1989 to 1996 he was founder and editor-in-chief of Softpanorama bulletin, an influential Russian language e-zine. From 1996 he is the webmaster of Softpanorama.org, a site with the self-claimed mission-statement to offer "slightly skeptical" positions regarding computer science education, system administration and software development professions.

== Contributions ==
He created a classification systems for computer viruses, an influential Russian language book on the subject – Computer Virology (1991) – and organized the first conference of anti-virus researchers for the region. His later Virus Bulletin Conference review became popular and is reproduced by multiple hacker and antivirus defence web sites.

He claims to have coined the term "Orthodox File Managers" (OFM) in 1996 in the first e-book devoted to the subject that systematized the field and tried to define the common features of major implementations of this class of file managers: such as FAR, Total Commander and Midnight Commander.

=== Open source issues ===
Since 1998 he has been a critic of the possibilities of open source and the dangers of its commercialization. In 1999 he introduced the highly controversial term "Vulgar Raymondism" and in 2005 coined the names of two philosophical schools on writing open source software: "Software Realism" and "Software Idealism". In 1999 he published two influential papers devoted to analyses and critique of Eric Raymond's views on the development of open source software: "Critique of vulgar Raymondism" and "A second look at the Cathedral and the Bazaar". These papers discuss the similarities between open source software development and academic research. The first paper produced a sharp response from Eric Raymond.

In 2000 he published a third paper, cited in academia, in which he analyzed the essence of Stallman's software development model and provided a comprehensive critique of GPL's foundations.

In 2005 he published the next of his series of papers devoted to a critical assessment of open source development, in which he tried to analyze achievements and pitfalls of two similar operating systems: Linux and Solaris.
