= IfrOSS =

Institut für Rechtsfragen der Freien und Open Source Software, abbreviated to ifrOSS, (English: Institute for legal issues regarding free and open source software) is a German organisation that provides legal services for free software.

ifrOSS co-founder Till Jaeger was the legal representation in the first court case to lead to a court ruling on the enforceability of the GNU General Public License (the primary licence for free software projects). The German court ruled in 2006 that the GNU GPL was indeed enforceable.

The main people involved in ifrOSS are Till Jaeger, Axel Metzger, Olaf Koglin, Julia Küng, Till Kreutzer.
