= Linux Kongress =

The Linux Kongress was an annual conference of Linux developers from around the world, that took place every year from 1994 to 2010. It started as a two-day conference in 1994, when Linux was in the early stages of development, and by 2003 had become a four-day event. It occurred every year in Germany except 2001 and 2007. During its lifespan, Linux-Kongress was one of the three major international grass-roots Linux and Open Source conferences in the world, along with linux.conf.au and Ottawa Linux Symposium.

The focus of Linux-Kongress was development topics, either in kernel or user space. The conference language was English. By the end, the event consisted of two days of conference preceded by two days of tutorials.

== Notable speakers ==
The conference was a meeting place for many different types of developers. Speakers at the conference included kernel developers like Linus Torvalds, Alan Cox, Theodore Ts'o, Rusty Russell, James Bottomley, user space developers like Kalle Dalheimer and Miguel de Icaza, and open source advocates like Eric S. Raymond and Jon Hall.

== History ==
In 1999 the conference cooperated with the Storage Management Workshop. In 2000 and 2001 there were several multi-day workshops sponsored by the German Ministry of Science and Education that preceded the conference. Also there was collaboration with NLUUG. In 2009 it was co-located with the OpenSolaris Developer Conference OSDevCon.

The conference was organized by the German Unix User Group (GUUG). In 2011, GUUG decided not to hold a Linux Kongress, and instead focus its resources on LinuxCon Europe. There has not been a Linux Kongress since.

Date	Country	Town	Location	Remark
June 30–July 1, 1994	Germany	Heidelberg		
May 21–23 1995	Germany	Berlin		
May 23–24 1996	Germany	Berlin	Haus am Koellnischen Park in Berlin (Tagungszentrum Berlin Mitte)	
May 21–23 1997	Germany	Würzburg	Fortress Marienberg	
June 3–6 1998	Germany	Cologne	Cologne University	
September 8–10 1999	Germany	Augsburg	University of Augsburg	
September 7–10 2000	Germany	Erlangen	Technical Faculty of the Friedrich-Alexander University Erlangen-Nuremberg	Collaboration with NLUUG
November 28–30 2001	Netherlands	Twente	University of Twente	Collaboration with NLUUG
September 4–6 2002	Germany	Cologne	Physics Institutes of the University of Cologne	Collaboration with NLUUG
October 14–17 2003	Germany	Saarbrücken	University of Saarland	
September 7–10 2004	Germany	Erlangen	Technical Faculty of the Friedrich-Alexander University Erlangen-Nuremberg	
October 11–14 2005	Germany	Hamburg	University of Hamburg	
September 5–8 2006	Germany	Nuremberg	Nuremberg Institute of Technology Georg Simon Ohm	
September 2–5 2007	United Kingdom	Cambridge	University Arms Hotel	Merged with LinuxConf.eu
October 7–10 2008	Germany	Hamburg	University of Hamburg	
October 27–30 2009	Germany	Dresden	Dorinth Hotel	Co-located with OSDevCon
September 21–24 2010	Germany	Nuremberg	Nuremberg Institute of Technology Georg Simon Ohm	
