= Homesteading the Noosphere =

1999 essay by Eric S. Raymond

"Homesteading the Noosphere" (abbreviated HtN) is an essay written by Eric S. Raymond about the social workings of open-source software development. It follows his previous piece "The Cathedral and the Bazaar" (1997).

The essay examines issues of project ownership and transfer, as well as investigating possible anthropological roots of the gift culture in open source as contrasted with the exchange culture of closed source software. Raymond also investigates the nature of the spread of open source into the untamed frontier of ideas he terms the noosphere, postulating that projects that range too far ahead of their time fail because they are too far out in the wilderness, and that successful projects tend to relate to existing projects.

Raymond delves into the contrast between the stated aims of open source and observed behaviors, and also explores the underlying motivations of people involved in the open-source movement. He notes that a key motivation for open-source practitioners is their membership of and reputation within each project's "tribe". In contrast, Microsoft's "embrace and extend" policy complexified and closed up Internet protocols with "protocol pollution."

== Citations ==
"Homesteading the Noosphere" has been referenced in various papers, including:

- The impact of ideology on effectiveness in open source software development teams
- An Overview of the Software Engineering Process and Tools in the Mozilla Project
- From Planning to Mature: on the Determinants of Open Source Take Off, Discussion paper 2005-17, Università degli Studi di Trento
- Open borders? Immigration in open source projects
- Public commons of geographic data: research and development challenges

== In popular culture ==
- In the Japanese novel series Log Horizon and its manga and anime adaptations, 300,000 Japanese players of a massively multiplayer online role-playing game suddenly find themselves transported into the game's world right as the game was being updated with an expansion pack by the name of Homesteading the Noosphere (ノウアスフィアの開墾, Nōasufia no Kaikon), which the author named after Raymond's essay. The first chapter of the novel series also bears the same name.

== See also ==
- Calculation in kind, also known as a money-free economy
