= Software peer review =

In software development, peer review is a type of software review in which a work product (document, code, or other) is examined by the author's colleagues, in order to evaluate the work product's technical content and quality.

== Purpose ==
The purpose of a peer review is to provide "a disciplined engineering practice for detecting and correcting defects in software artifacts, and preventing their leakage into field operations" according to the Capability Maturity Model.

When performed as part of each Software development process activity, peer reviews identify problems that can be fixed early in the lifecycle. That is to say, a peer review that identifies a requirements problem during the Requirements analysis activity is cheaper and easier to fix than during the Software architecture or Software testing activities.

The National Software Quality Experiment, evaluating the effectiveness of peer reviews, finds, "a favorable return on investment for software inspections; savings exceeds costs by 4 to 1". To state it another way, it is four times more costly, on average, to identify and fix a software problem later.

== Distinction from other types of software review ==
Peer reviews are distinct from management reviews, which are conducted by management representatives rather than by colleagues, and for management and control purposes rather than for technical evaluation. They are also distinct from software audit reviews, which are conducted by personnel external to the project, to evaluate compliance with specifications, standards, contractual agreements, or other criteria.

== Review processes ==
Peer review processes exist across a spectrum of formality, with relatively unstructured activities such as "buddy checking" towards one end of the spectrum, and more Informal approaches such as walkthroughs, technical peer reviews, and software inspections, at the other. The IEEE defines formal structures, roles, and processes for each of the last three.

Management representatives are typically not involved in the conduct of a peer review except when included because of specific technical expertise or when the work product under review is a management-level document. This is especially true of line managers of other participants in the review.

Processes for formal peer reviews, such as software inspections, define specific roles for each participant, quantify stages with entry/exit criteria, capture software metrics on the peer review process.

== "Open source" reviews ==
In the free / open source community, something like peer review has taken place in the engineering and evaluation of computer software. In this context, the rationale for peer review has its equivalent in Linus's law, often phrased: "Given enough eyeballs, all bugs are shallow", meaning "If there are enough reviewers, all problems are easy to solve." Eric S. Raymond has written influentially about peer review in software development.
