= Linucon =

Multi-genre convention in Austin, Texas

- Status: Inactive
- Genre: Science fiction/Linux
- Venue: Red Lion Inn
- Locations: Austin, Texas
- Country: United States
- Inaugurated: 2004
- Most recent: 2005
- Organizer: Rob Landley

Linucon was a combination Linux expo/science fiction convention in Austin, Texas. Conceived as a "sister convention" to Penguicon, Linucon was co-founded by Rob Landley and Stu Green.

Two Linucons were held. The first Linucon was held October 8–10, 2004, at the Red Lion Inn located at 6121 North I-35 in Austin. Linucon 2.0 was held September 30 – October 2, 2005, at the Ambassador Hotel located at the intersection of I-35 and Highway 183.

The science fiction side had three main tracks: an anime track, a literary track, and a gaming track. These tracks included cosplay (and a Masquerade), filk, a dealer's room, panels, author readings and signings, Birds of a Feather sessions, and an art show. The convention suite featured caffeinated Jell-O and ice cream made with liquid nitrogen. There was also a live action role-playing game. The video room played around the clock and both gaming rooms (computer and paper) were open 24 hours.

The technical side ranged over such subjects as Linux kernel architecture, security and network administration, web design, use of Linux on a laptop, computer gaming, digital art, electronic publishing, and machinima. Free wireless internet access was available. There were panels, tutorials, an "installfest" and featured guests who went head to head in a first person shooter elimination tournament (the "celebrity fragfest").

Notable guests included actor Wil Wheaton, Jay "Tron Guy" Maynard, game designer Steve Jackson, and Linux activist Eric S. Raymond.

== Aftermath ==
Financial difficulties and the departure of primary founder Rob Landley from Austin led to the shutdown of Linucon after the second event.
