= Sambar Server =

The Sambar Server is or was a combined "HTTP, HTTPS, XMPP, FTP, SMTP, POP3, DNS, DHCP, Java Servlet, JSP, and proxy server" developed by Tod Sambar. The proxy server also provided a dial-on-demand service to an Internet service provider. Initially developed for the Microsoft Windows platform, later a version for Linux was also available. Some releases are still downloadable for free from various software distribution sites.

A limited shareware version was widely distributed, while the full functionality was only available in the commercial version.

The Windows version does not need a server operating system, but ran even on Windows 95 or Windows XP Home.

Sambar Server came with its own server-side scripting language called Cscript, derived from the programming language C.

The first release appeared in 1996–1997. The latest release was 7.0, published in March 2007. It "runs on XP to Win 10". Tod Sambar claims that "Commercial, shareware, and freeware licensees numbered over 200,000 and the server powered over 13,000 commercial Internet sites at its peak."

At the end of 2007, Tod Sambar announced the end of development. As of at least October 2015, the Sambar Server is still in use, as testified on the "Sambar Webmaster Community" forum.

The domain www.sambar.com, from which the Sambar Sever was distributed and serviced, is still registered under Tod Sambar's name, but is not connected to the Internet. Only two MX records are registered in the DNS (Domain Name System).

== In literature ==
- Strom, Erik (1998). Perl CGI programming: no experience required. San Francisco, CA (USA): SYBEX. ISBN 9780782121575. OCLC 877748555.
