= Software audit review =

A software audit review, or software audit, is a type of software review in which one or more auditors who are not members of the software development organization conduct "An independent examination of a software product, software process, or set of software processes to assess compliance with specifications, standards, contractual agreements, or other criteria".

"Software product" mostly, but not exclusively, refers to some kind of technical document. IEEE Std. 1028 offers a list of 32 "examples of software products subject to audit", including documentary products such as various sorts of plan, contracts, specifications, designs, procedures, standards, and reports, but also non-documentary products such as data, test data, and deliverable media.

Software audits are distinct from software peer reviews and software management reviews in that they are conducted by personnel external to, and independent of, the software development organization, and are concerned with compliance of products or processes, rather than with their technical content, technical quality, or managerial implications.

The term "software audit review" is adopted here to designate the form of software audit described in IEEE Std. 1028.

== Objectives and participants ==
"The purpose of a software audit is to provide an independent evaluation of conformance of software products and processes to applicable regulations, standards, guidelines, plans, and procedures". The following roles are recommended:

- The Initiator (who might be a manager in the audited organization, a customer or user representative of the audited organization, or a third party), decides upon the need for an audit, establishes its purpose and scope, specifies the evaluation criteria, identifies the audit personnel, decides what follow-up actions will be required, and distributes the audit report.
- The Lead Auditor (who must be someone "free from bias and influence that could reduce his ability to make independent, objective evaluations") is responsible for administrative tasks such as preparing the audit plan and assembling and managing the audit team, and for ensuring that the audit meets its objectives.
- The Recorder documents anomalies, action items, decisions, and recommendations made by the audit team.
- The Auditors (who must be, like the Lead Auditor, free from bias) examine products defined in the audit plan, document their observations, and recommend corrective actions. (There may be only a single auditor.)
- The Audited Organization provides a liaison to the auditors, and provides all information requested by the auditors. When the audit is completed, the audited organization should implement corrective actions and recommendations.

== Tools ==
Parts of Software audit could be done using static analysis tools that analyze application code and score its conformance with standards, guidelines, best practices. From the List of tools for static code analysis some are covering a very large spectrum from code to architecture review, and could be use for benchmarking.
