= Software management review =

A Software management review is a management study into a project's status and allocation of resources. It is different from both a software engineering peer review, which evaluates the technical quality of software products, and a software audit, which is an externally conducted audit into a project's compliance to specifications, contractual agreements, and other criteria.

== Process ==
A management review can be an informal process, but generally requires a formal structure and rules of conduct, such as those advocated in the IEEE 1028 standard, which are:

1. Evaluate entry?
2. Management preparation?
3. Plan the structure of the review
4. Overview of review procedures?
5. [Individual] Preparation?
6. [Group] Examination?
7. Rework/follow-up?
8. [Exit evaluation]?

== Definition ==
In software engineering, a management review is defined by the IEEE as:

A systematic evaluation of a software acquisition, supply, development, operation, or maintenance process performed by or on behalf of management ... [and conducted] to monitor progress, determine the status of plans and schedules, confirm requirements and their system allocation, or evaluate the effectiveness of management approaches used to achieve fitness for purpose. Management reviews support decisions about corrective actions, changes in the allocation of resources, or changes to the scope of the project.

Management reviews are carried out by, or on behalf of, the management personnel having direct responsibility for the system. Management reviews identify consistency with and deviations from plans, or adequacies and inadequacies of management procedures. This examination may require more than one meeting. The examination need not address all aspects of the product."
