= SouthEast LinuxFest =

Annual open source conference in Southeast USA

SouthEast LinuxFest logo

SouthEast LinuxFest (SELF) is an annual Linux and open source software conference held in the Southeast United States. It is a Friday through Sunday weekend event held in the second or third weekend of June. The event is dedicated to education, discussion, and networking related to Linux, free software, and open source.

== Event Description ==
The SouthEast LinuxFest is a free event, focused on the community of Linux and other open source software projects. During the event, conference attendees listen to a number of presentations, attend workshops, and make contact with a number of companies and non-profit organizations who share an interest in open source software. SELF also co-locate several sub events like HAM/Amateur radio study and exams, LAN party and craft beer share. The event raises money through optional supporting attendee packages and by charging commercial vendors a donation fee for their booths. This allows the festival to stay free for all who wish to come, while raising enough money to cover overhead such as the venue.

== Location ==
The SouthEast LinuxFest is currently held in Charlotte, NC. It has so far been held generally in the I-85 corridor including Clemson, SC and Spartanburg, SC. However, the organizers have openly bid the event venue through the southeast including places outside the I-85 corridor such as Charleston, SC, Nashville, TN, and Asheville, NC.

== History ==
The SouthEast LinuxFest started in 2009 as a Saturday only event in Clemson, SC. Due to overwhelming attendance and limited venue space, in 2010 and 2011 it moved to Spartanburg, SC. In 2010 it became a two-day event over Saturday and Sunday. In 2011 it became a three-day event from Friday through Sunday. This is the current format. In 2012 it moved to Charlotte, NC to provide better air transportation access, a larger venue, and reduce costs. In 2020 due to the COVID-19 pandemic, Southeast Linuxfest was held as a virtual conference.

== Previous event details ==
- SELF Wiki - Previous Events Attendance figures, location, sponsors, pictures, audio and video of presentations
