= Exit criteria =

Exit criteria are the criteria or requirements which must be met to complete a specific task or process as used in some fields of business or science, such as software engineering.

== Usage ==
The term exit criteria is often used in research and development, but it could be applicable to any field where business process reengineering is (or could be) applied. The benefits of business process re-engineering — including the use of terms such as this one — could include: understanding goals clearly; using language (and data) carefully when talking about (or measuring) methods for getting things done; and taking a scientific approach towards evaluating and improving the methods that are used.

For example, for Fagan inspection, the low-level document must comply with specific exit criteria (as specified in the high-level document) before the development process can be taken to the next phase.

In telecommunications, when testing new software or hardware for release, a set of test specifications are created to test this new product to ensure that it meets minimum acceptable operational specifications. This test specification will state the minimum criteria necessary for the testing process to be considered complete and the product is ready for release IE: Exit the testing phase of the program.
