= German Unix User Group =

The German Unix User Group (GUUG) is a registered association of German Unix users. The user group intends to carry out scientific research to promote technical development and communication of open systems which were initiated in particular by the operating system Unix.
