= Eric S. Raymond =

US programmer, author, and open-source advocate

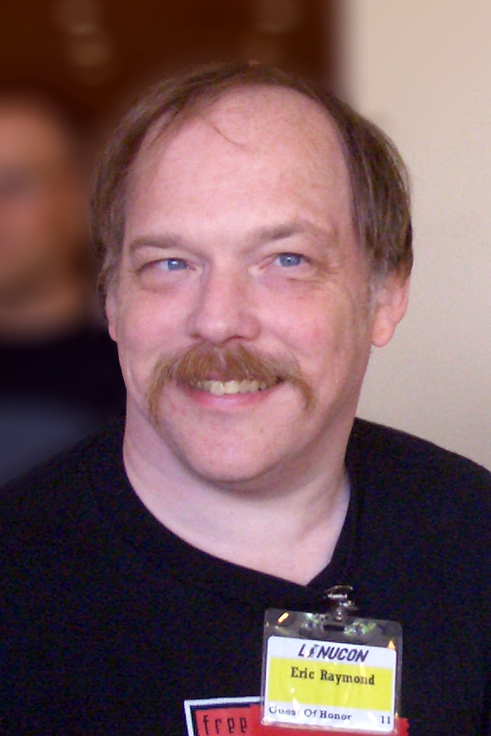
- Raymond at Linucon in 2004
- Born: December 4, 1957 (age 68); Boston, Massachusetts, US
- Education: University of Pennsylvania
- Occupations: Software developer, author
- Website: www.catb.org/esr/; esr.ibiblio.org

Eric Steven Raymond (born December 4, 1957), often referred to as ESR, is an American software developer, open-source software advocate, and author of the 1997 essay and 1999 book The Cathedral and the Bazaar. He wrote a guidebook for the Roguelike game NetHack. In the 1990s, he edited and updated the Jargon File, published as The New Hacker's Dictionary.

== Early life ==
Raymond was born in Boston, Massachusetts in 1957, and lived in Venezuela as a child. His family moved to Pennsylvania in 1971. He developed cerebral palsy at birth; his weakened physical condition motivated him to go into computing.

== Career ==
Raymond began his programming career writing proprietary software, between 1980 and 1985. In 1990, noting that the Jargon File had not been maintained since about 1983, he adopted it, but not without criticism; Paul Dourish maintains an archived original version of the Jargon File, because, he says, Raymond's updates "essentially destroyed what held it together."

In 1996, Raymond took over development of the open-source email software "popclient", renaming it to Fetchmail. Soon after this experience, in 1997, he wrote the essay "The Cathedral and the Bazaar", detailing his thoughts on open-source software development and why it should be done as openly as possible (the "bazaar" approach). The essay was based in part on his experience in developing Fetchmail. He first presented his thesis at the annual Linux Kongress on May 27, 1997. He later expanded the essay into a book, The Cathedral and the Bazaar: Musings on Linux and Open Source by an Accidental Revolutionary, in 1999. The essay has been widely cited. The internal white paper by Frank Hecker that led to the release of the Mozilla (then Netscape) source code in 1998 cited The Cathedral and the Bazaar as "independent validation" of ideas proposed by Eric Hahn and Jamie Zawinski. Hahn would later describe the 1999 book as "clearly influential".

From the late 1990s onward, due in part to the popularity of his essay, Raymond became a prominent voice in the open source movement. He co-founded the Open Source Initiative (OSI) in 1998, taking on the self-appointed role of ambassador of open source to the press, business and public. He remains active in OSI, but stepped down as president of the initiative in February 2005. In early March 2020, he was removed from two Open Source Initiative mailing lists due to posts that violated the OSI's Code of Conduct.

In 1998, Raymond received and published a Microsoft document expressing worry about the quality of rival open-source software. He named this document, together with others subsequently leaked, "The Halloween Documents".

Between 2000 and 2002, he created Configuration Menu Language 2 (CML2), a source code configuration system; while originally intended for the Linux operating system, it was rejected by kernel developers. (Raymond attributed this rejection to "kernel list politics", but Linus Torvalds said in a 2007 mailing list post that as a matter of policy, the development team preferred more incremental changes.) Raymond's 2003 book The Art of Unix Programming discusses user tools for programming and other tasks.

Some versions of NetHack still include Raymond's guide. He has also contributed code and content to the free software video game The Battle for Wesnoth.

Raymond is the main developer of NTPsec, a "secure, hardened replacement" for the Unix utility NTP.

Raymond has written numerous open-source tools, including cvs-fast-export, a tool for exporting CVS repositories to Git fast-import streams, and "reposurgeon", a tool for exporting SVN repositories.

== Views on open source ==
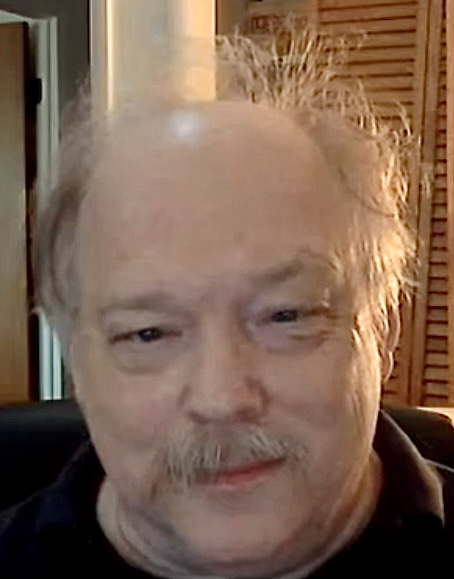
ESR at the SouthEast LinuxFest in 2019

Raymond coined an aphorism he dubbed Linus's law, inspired by Linus Torvalds: "Given enough eyeballs, all bugs are shallow". It first appeared in his book The Cathedral and the Bazaar.

Raymond has refused to speculate on whether the "bazaar" development model could be applied to works such as books and music, saying that he does not want to "weaken the winning argument for open-sourcing software by tying it to a potential loser".

Raymond claims his method of promoting open-source software has been effective because he has used "a strategy of making rational, technical, utility-maximization arguments in which I explicitly disclaimed having any normative or moralizing agenda." Raymond has had a number of public disputes with other figures in the free software movement. As head of the Open Source Initiative, he argued that advocates should focus on the potential for better products. The "very seductive" moral and ethical rhetoric of Richard Stallman and the Free Software Foundation fails, he said, "not because his principles are wrong, but because that kind of language… simply does not persuade anybody".

In a 2008 essay, he defended programmers' right to issue work under proprietary licenses: "I think that if a programmer wants to write a program and sell it, it's neither my business nor anyone else's but his customer's what the terms of sale are." In the same essay he described his own strong emotional response to proprietary software and negative experiences working as a software developer writing proprietary software.

== Political beliefs and activism ==
Raymond is a member of the Libertarian Party and a gun rights advocate. He has endorsed the open source firearms organization Defense Distributed, calling them "friends of freedom" and writing "I approve of any development that makes it more difficult for governments and criminals to monopolize the use of force. As 3D printers become less expensive and more ubiquitous, this could be a major step in the right direction."

In 2015, Raymond accused the Ada Initiative and other women in tech groups of attempting to entrap male open source leaders and accuse them of rape, saying "Try to avoid even being alone, ever, because there is a chance that a 'women in tech' advocacy group is going to try to collect your scalp".

Raymond has claimed that "Gays experimented with unfettered promiscuity in the 1970s and got AIDS as a consequence", and that "Police who react to a random black male behaving suspiciously who might be in the critical age range as though he is a near-imminent lethal threat, are being rational, not racist".

A progressive campaign, "The Great Slate", was successful in raising funds for candidates in part by asking for contributions from tech workers in return for not posting similar quotes by Raymond. Matasano Security employee and Great Slate fundraiser Thomas Ptacek said, "I've been torturing Twitter with lurid Eric S. Raymond quotes for years. Every time I do, 20 people beg me to stop." It is estimated that, as of March 2018, over $30,000 has been raised in this way.

== Religious beliefs ==
Raymond describes himself as neo-pagan.

== Bibliography ==
- Hamerly, Jim, Paquin, Tom and Walton, Susan; Freeing the Source: The Story of Mozilla, in Open Sources: Voices from the Open Source Revolution, O'Reilly, 1999. 280 pp, ISBN 1-56592-582-3
- Wayner, Peter; Free for All: How LINUX and the Free Software Movement Undercut the High-Tech Titans, HarperCollins, 2000, 340 pp, ISBN 0-06-662050-3
- Suarez-Potts, Louis; Interview: Frank Hecker, Community Articles, May 1, 2001, openoffice.org, OpenOffice website
- Moody, Glyn; Rebel Code: Linux and the Open Source Revolution, Basic Books, 2002, 342 pp, ISBN 978-0-7382-0333-1

=== By Eric Raymond ===
==== Books ====
- The New Hacker's Dictionary (editor; MIT Press, ISBN 0-262-68092-0) – printed version of the Jargon File with Raymond listed as the editor.
- The Cathedral and the Bazaar (O'Reilly; hardcover ISBN 1-56592-724-9, 1999) – includes "The Cathedral and the Bazaar", "Homesteading the Noosphere", "The Magic Cauldron" and "Revenge of the Hackers"
- The Art of Unix Programming (Addison-Wesley, 2003; ISBN 0-13-142901-9)
- Cameron, Debra; Elliott, James; Loy, Marc; Raymond, Eric; Rosenblatt, William ‘Bill’, eds. (2004), Learning GNU Emacs (3rd ed.), O'Reilly Media, ISBN 978-0-596-00648-8)

==== Writings posted or archived on his website ====
- The Art of Unix Usability, the book about programming and user interface philosophy in UNIX
- How to Ask Questions the Smart Way, mirrored on personal site
- "Release Early, Release Often", excerpt from The Cathedral and the Bazaar, mirrored on personal site
- "Eric Raymond's FAQ collection", mirrored on his personal site. Includes links to Linux Documentation Project.

== See also ==
- Hacker ethic
- Halloween documents
- Release early, release often
- Revolution OS (film)
