= CAST (company) =

Technology corporation

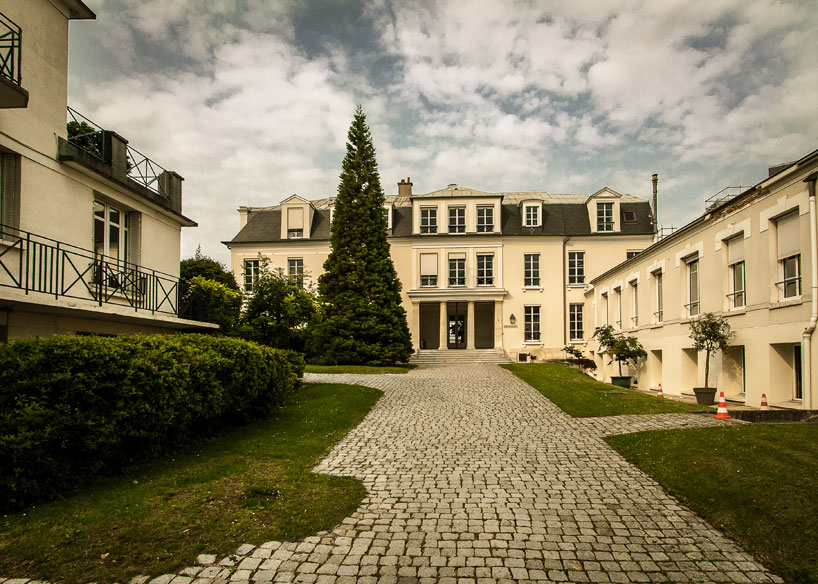
- CAST's headquarters in Meudon, near Paris.
- Type: Private
- Industry: ISV
- Founded: November 1990; 36 years ago, in Paris, France
- Founder: Vincent Delaroche
- Headquarters: EU Hqs: Meudon near Paris; US Hqs: New York City
- Key people: Vincent Delaroche (chairman and CEO); Bill Curtis (Chief Scientist); Ernie Hu (Chief Operating Officer); Alexandre Rerolle (group CFO)
- Products: CAST Highlight; CAST Imaging
- Owner: Bridgepoint Group (2022-present)
- Number of employees: 380 (2019)
- Website: www.castsoftware.com

CAST is a technology corporation headquartered in New York City and France, near Paris. It was founded in 1990 in Paris, France, by Vincent Delaroche.

The firm markets products that generate software intelligence with a technology based on semantic analysis of software source code and components. In addition, CAST offers hosting and consulting services.

On May 18, 2022, the company and Bridgepoint Group announced they were entering into exclusive negotiations for the acquisition by Bridgepoint Development Capital funds of a majority stake in CAST to support the development of the software intelligence market in the coming decade.

On July 21, 2022, Bridgepoint Group acquired a majority stake, while Vincent Deleroche rolled over the majority of his shares, and the management invested in the new holding, Financière Da Vinci, alongside Bridgepoint Group and Vincent Delaroche. Following the transaction, Vincent Delaroche and the executive team in place have continued to manage the company's activities as President of Financière Da Vinci and CEO of CAST.

== History ==
CAST was founded in 1990 in Paris by Vincent Delaroche. In 1996, it shipped its first software product based on semantic analysis of code. The CAST Application Intelligence Platform (CAST AIP) was first launched in 2004, initially introducing software quality measurement. In 2012, the firm announced support for the Object Management Group (OMG) Automated Function Point (AFP) Standard, one way of measuring application development productivity.

In 2017, CAST Highlight launched a SaaS product scanning portfolio of software to provide metrics on health, cloud migration capabilities, and open-source license risks.

In early 2019, CAST AIP is rebranded and becomes CAST Imaging, a product representing graphically the inner workings of software systems.

The firm's leadership includes Bill Curtis, who developed the capability maturity model at the Software Engineering Institute (SEI) in the early 1990s and then at the Consortium for IT Software Quality (CISQ).

CAST's head of product development, Olivier Bonsignour, co-wrote a book with Capers Jones.

== Products ==
CAST provides 2 sets of products of different technologies, pricing, implementation models, and usage: CAST Highlight and CAST Imaging.

=== CAST Highlight ===
CAST Highlight is a SaaS product for performing rapid application portfolio analysis. It analyzes the source code of applications to assess their cloud readiness, [1 technical debt, open-source risks, and computes a green index. Software insights collected from the source code analysis may also be correlated with built-in qualitative surveys for adding business context insights on top of technical information.

=== CAST Imaging ===
CAST Imaging reverse-engineers all database structures, code components, and interdependencies in custom-built applications. It provides interactive architecture blueprints, data-call graphs, and end-to-end transaction flows in a Web application with the ability to export details externally. CAST Imaging's ability to understand the application's inner workings and map the internal dependencies between all its elements allows it to also identify structural flaws standardized by ISO (ISO-5055) and classified under robustness, efficiency (performance, consumption), security, and maintainability.

== Research ==
The firm's Research Labs subsidiary developed a repository of industry data and issued a biennial report called CAST Research on Application Software Health (CRASH). CRASH data has been cited and published in articles in IEEE Software and Research. Its labs were active in analyzing the phenomenon of technical debt, co-hosting a research forum on this topic with the University of Maryland’s Department of Information Systems. [2]

Technical debt focused on analyzing applications instead of technology layers, and as a consequence, most of the research had been conducted in the domain of inter- and intra-technology dependency analysis.
