= List of ISO standards 20000–21999 =

This is a list of published (Note: This list generally excludes draft versions.) International Organization for Standardization (ISO) standards and other deliverables. (Note: ISO deliverables include "specifications" (ISO/PAS, ISO/TS), "reports" (ISO/TR), etc, which are not referred to by ISO as "standards".) For a complete and up-to-date list of all the ISO standards, see the ISO catalogue.

The standards are protected by copyright and most of them must be purchased. However, about 300 of the standards produced by ISO and IEC's Joint Technical Committee 1 (JTC 1) have been made freely and publicly available.

== ISO 20000 – ISO 20999 ==
- ISO/IEC 20000 Information technology – Service management
- ISO/IEC TR 20002:2012 Information technology – Telecommunications and information exchange between systems – Managed P2P: Framework
- ISO/IEC TR 20004:2015 Information technology - Security techniques - Refining software vulnerability analysis under ISO/IEC 15408 and ISO/IEC 18045
- ISO/IEC 20005:2013 Information technology - Sensor networks - Services and interfaces supporting collaborative information processing in intelligent sensor networks
- ISO/IEC 20006 Information technology for learning, education and training - Information model for competency
  - ISO/IEC 20006-1:2014 Part 1: Competency general framework and information model
  - ISO/IEC 20006-2:2015 Part 2: Proficiency level information model
- ISO/IEC TR 20007:2014 Information technology - Cultural and linguistic interoperability - Definitions and relationship between symbols, icons, animated icons, pictograms, characters and glyphs
- ISO/IEC 20008 Information technology - Security techniques - Anonymous digital signatures
  - ISO/IEC 20008-1:2013 Part 1: General
  - ISO/IEC 20008-2:2013 Part 2: Mechanisms using a group public key
- ISO/IEC 20009 Information technology - Security techniques - Anonymous entity authentication
  - ISO/IEC 20009-1:2013 Part 1: General
  - ISO/IEC 20009-2:2013 Part 2: Mechanisms based on signatures using a group public key
  - ISO/IEC 20009-3:2022 Part 3: Mechanisms based on blind signatures
  - ISO/IEC 20009-4:2017 Part 4: Mechanisms based on weak secrets
- ISO/IEC TS 20013:2015 Information technology for learning, education and training - A reference framework of e-Portfolio information
- ISO/IEC 20016 Information technology for learning, education and training - Language accessibility and human interface equivalencies (HIEs) in e-learning applications
  - ISO/IEC 20016-1:2014 Part 1: Framework and reference model for semantic interoperability
- ISO/IEC TR 20017:2011 Information technology - Radio frequency identification for item management - Electromagnetic interference impact of ISO/IEC 18000 interrogator emitters on implantable pacemakers and implantable cardioverter defibrillators
- ISO 20022 Financial services – UNIversal Financial Industry message scheme
- ISO/TS 20026:2017 Intelligent transport systems – Cooperative ITS – Test architecture
- ISO/IEC TS 20027:2015 Biometrics interoperability profiles – Best practices for slap tenprint captures
- ISO/IEC 20060:2010 Information technology – Open Terminal Architecture (OTA) – Virtual machine
- ISO/IEC 20061:2001 Information technology – 12,65 mm wide magnetic tape cassette for information interchange – Helical scan recording – DTF-2
- ISO/IEC 20062:2001 Information technology – 8 mm wide magnetic tape cartridge for information interchange – Helical scan recording – VXA-1 format
- ISO/PAS 20065:2016 Acoustics – Objective method for assessing the audibility of tones in noise – Engineering method
- ISO/IEC TS 20071 Information technology – User interface component accessibility
  - ISO/IEC TS 20071-11:2012 Part 11: Guidance for alternative text for images
  - ISO/IEC TS 20071-21:2015 Part 21: Guidance on audio descriptions
  - ISO/IEC TS 20071-25:2017 Part 25: Guidance on the audio presentation of text in videos, including captions, subtitles and other on-screen text
- ISO 20072:2009 Aerosol drug delivery device design verification—Requirements and test methods
- ISO/IEC 20113:2004 Information technology – Telecommunications and information exchange between systems – Private Integrated Services Network – Specification, functional model and information flows – Make call request supplementary service
- ISO/IEC 20114:2004 Information technology – Telecommunications and information exchange between systems – Private Integrated Services Network (PISN) – Inter-exchange signalling protocol – Make call request supplementary service
- ISO/IEC 20115:2004 Information technology – Telecommunications and information exchange between systems – Private Integrated Services Network – Use of QSIG for Message Centre Access (MCA) profile standard
- ISO/IEC 20116:2004 Information technology – Telecommunications and information exchange between systems – Private Integrated Services Network – Specification, functional model and information flows – Message centre monitoring and mailbox identification supplementary services
- ISO/IEC 20117:2004 Information technology – Telecommunications and information exchange between systems – Private Integrated Services Network – Inter-exchange signalling protocol – Message centre monitoring and mailbox identification supplementary services
- ISO 20121:2012 Event sustainability management systems - Requirements with guidance for use
- ISO 20128:2006 Milk products – Enumeration of presumptive Lactobacillus acidophilus on a selective medium – Colony-count technique at 37 degrees C
- ISO 20155:2017 Ships and marine technology - Test method of flow induced in-pipe noise source characteristics for a ship-used pump
- ISO 20160:2006 Implants for surgery – Metallic materials – Classification of microstructures for alpha+beta titanium alloy bars
- ISO/IEC 20161:2001 Information technology – Telecommunications and information exchange between systems – Private Integrated Services Network – Use of QSIG at the C reference point between a PINX and an Interconnecting Network
- ISO/IEC 20162:2001 Information technology - Data interchange on 300 mm optical disk cartridges of type WORM (Write Once Read Many) using irreversible effects - Capacity: 30 Gbytes per cartridge
- ISO 20228:2019 Interpreting services — Legal interpreting — Requirements
- ISO/IEC 20243:2015 Information Technology - Open Trusted Technology ProviderTM Standard (O-TTPS) - Mitigating maliciously tainted and counterfeit products
- ISO 20245:2017 Cross-border trade of second-hand goods
- ISO/IEC 20246:2017 Software and systems engineering - Work product reviews
- ISO 20252:2012 Market, opinion and social research — Vocabulary and service requirements
- ISO 20275:2017 Financial services – Entity legal forms (ELF)
- ISO/TR 20278:2015 Unwanted reflections from the active and inactive areas of display surfaces visible during use
- ISO/TS 20282 Usability of consumer products and products for public use
- ISO 20283 Mechanical vibration - Measurement of vibration on ships
  - ISO 20283-2:2008 Part 2: Measurement of structural vibration
  - ISO 20283-3:2006 Part 3: Pre-installation vibration measurement of shipboard equipment
  - ISO 20283-4:2012 Part 4: Measurement and evaluation of vibration of the ship propulsion machinery
  - ISO 20283-5:2016 Part 5: Guidelines for measurement, evaluation and reporting of vibration with regard to habitability on passenger and merchant ships
- ISO 20301:2014 Health informatics – Health cards – General characteristics
- ISO 20302:2014 Health informatics – Health cards – Numbering system and registration procedure for issuer identifiers
- ISO 20308:2017 Traditional Chinese medicine – Gua Sha instruments
- ISO 20361:2015 Liquid pumps and pump units – Noise test code – Grades 2 and 3 of accuracy
- ISO 20381:2009 Mobile elevating work platforms - Symbols for operator controls and other displays
- ISO 20387:2018 Biotechnology — Biobanking — General requirements for biobanking
- ISO 20400:2017 Sustainable procurement - Guidance
- ISO/TS 20428:2017 Health informatics – Data elements and their metadata for describing structured clinical genomic sequence information in electronic health records
- ISO/TS 20440:2016 Health informatics – Identification of medicinal products – Implementation guide for ISO 11239 data elements and structures for the unique identification and exchange of regulated information on pharmaceutical dose forms, units of presentation, routes of administration and packaging
- ISO/TS 20452:2007 Requirements and Logical Data Model for a Physical Storage Format (PSF) and an Application Program Interface (API) and Logical Data Organization for PSF used in Intelligent Transport Systems (ITS) Database Technology
- ISO 20456:2017 Measurement of fluid flow in closed conduits – Guidance for the use of electromagnetic flowmeters for conductive liquids
- ISO/TR 20461:2000 Determination of uncertainty for volume measurements made using the gravimetric method
- ISO 20471 High visibility clothing — Test methods and requirements
- ISO/TS 20477:2017 Nanotechnologies - Standard terms and their definition for cellulose nanomaterial
- ISO 20480 Fine bubble technology – General principles for usage and measurement of fine bubbles
  - ISO 20480-1:2017 Part 1: Terminology
- ISO 20484:2017 Non-destructive testing - Leak testing - Vocabulary
- ISO 20488:2018 Online consumer reviews -- Principles and requirements for their collection, moderation and publication
- ISO 20498 Traditional Chinese medicine – Computerized tongue image analysis system
  - ISO 20498-2:2017 Part 2: Light environment
- ISO/TR 20514:2005 Health informatics – Electronic health record – Definition, scope and context
- ISO 20519:2017 Ships and marine technology - Specification for bunkering of liquefied natural gas fuelled vessels
- ISO/TR 20526:2017 Account-based ticketing state of the art report
- ISO/TR 20529 Intelligent transport systems – Framework for green ITS (G-ITS) standards
  - ISO/TR 20529-1:2017 Part 1: General information and use case definitions
- ISO 20539:2019 Translation, interpreting and related technology — Vocabulary
- ISO/TR 20545:2017 Intelligent transport systems – Vehicle/roadway warning and control systems – Report on standardisation for vehicle automated driving systems (RoVAS)/Beyond driver assistance systems
- ISO/IEC 20563:2001 Information technology - 80 mm (1,23 Gbytes per side) and 120 mm (3,95 Gbytes per side) DVD-recordable disk (DVD-R)
- ISO/TS 20625:2002 Electronic data interchange for administration, commerce and transport (EDIFACT) – Rules for generation of XML scheme files (XSD) on the basis of EDI(FACT) implementation guidelines
- ISO/IEC 20648:2016 Information technology - TLS specification for storage systems
- ISO 20653 Road vehicles - Degrees of protection (IP-Code) - Protection of electrical equipment against foreign objects, water and access
- ISO 20669:2017 Non-destructive testing - Pulsed eddy current testing of ferromagnetic metallic components
- ISO 20671-1:2021 Brand evaluation - Part 1: Principles and fundamentals
- ISO 20671-2:2023 Brand evaluation - Part 2: Implementation and reporting
- ISO 20671-3:2023 Brand evaluation - Part 3: Requirements and recommendations for brands related to geographical indications
- ISO 20674-1:2019 Information and documentation — Transliteration of scripts in use in Thailand — Part 1: Transliteration of Akson-Thai-Noi
- ISO 20700 Guidelines for management consultancy services
- ISO 20712 Water safety signs and beach safety flags
  - ISO 20712-1:2008 Part 1: Specifications for water safety signs used in workplaces and public areas
  - ISO 20712-2:2007 Part 2: Specifications for beach safety flags - Colour, shape, meaning and performance
  - ISO 20712-3:2014 Part 3: Guidance for use
- ISO 20725:2004 Textile machinery – Condensers for cotton spinning – Vocabulary and principles of construction
- ISO 20726:2004 Textile machinery – Hopper feeders for cotton spinning – Vocabulary and principles of construction
- ISO 20727:2004 Textile machinery – Mixing bale openers for cotton spinning – Vocabulary and principles of construction
- ISO/IEC 20741:2017 Systems and software engineering - Guideline for the evaluation and selection of software engineering tools
- ISO 20743:2013 Textiles – Determination of antibacterial activity of textile products
- ISO/IEC TR 20748 Information technology for learning, education and training - Learning analytics interoperability
  - ISO/IEC TR 20748-1:2016 Part 1: Reference model
  - ISO/IEC TR 20748-2:2017 Part 2: System requirements
- ISO 20771:2020 Legal translation — Requirements
- ISO 20775:2009 Information and documentation - Schema for holdings information
- ISO 20785 Dosimetry for exposures to cosmic radiation in civilian aircraft
  - ISO 20785-1:2012 Part 1: Conceptual basis for measurements
  - ISO 20785-2:2011 Part 2: Characterization of instrument response
  - ISO 20785-3:2015 Part 3: Measurements at aviation altitudes
- ISO/IEC 20802 Information technology – Open data protocol (OData) v4.0
  - ISO/IEC 20802-1:2016 Part 1: Core
  - ISO/IEC 20802-2:2016 Part 2: OData JSON Format
- ISO 20807:2004 Non-destructive testing – Qualification of personnel for limited application of non-destructive testing
- ISO/TR 20811:2017 Optics and photonics – Lasers and laser-related equipment – Laser-induced molecular contamination testing
- ISO 20815 Petroleum, petrochemical and natural gas industries - Production assurance and reliability management
- ISO 20816 Mechanical vibration – Measurement and evaluation of machine vibration
  - ISO 20816-1:2016 Part 1: General guidelines
  - ISO 20816-2:2017 Part 2: Land-based gas turbines, steam turbines and generators in excess of 40 MW, with fluid-film bearings and rated speeds of 1 500 r/min, 1 800 r/min, 3 000 r/min and 3 600 r/min
- ISO/TR 20824:2007 Ophthalmic instruments – Background for light hazard specification in ophthalmic instrument standards
- ISO/TR 20831:2017 Health informatics – Medication management concepts and definitions
- ISO/TS 20836:2005 Microbiology of food and animal feeding stuffs – Polymerase chain reaction (PCR) for the detection of food-borne pathogens – Performance testing for thermal cyclers
- ISO 20837:2006 Microbiology of food and animal feeding stuffs – Polymerase chain reaction (PCR) for the detection of food-borne pathogens – Requirements for sample preparation for qualitative detection
- ISO 20838:2006 Microbiology of food and animal feeding stuffs – Polymerase chain reaction (PCR) for the detection of food-borne pathogens – Requirements for amplification and detection for qualitative methods
- ISO 20900:2019 ISO 20900:2019 Intelligent transport systems — Partially automated parking systems (PAPS) — Performance requirements and test procedures
- ISO 20906:2009 Acoustics – Unattended monitoring of aircraft sound in the vicinity of airports
- ISO/IEC TR 20913:2016 Information technology - Data centres - Guidelines on holistic investigation methodology for data centre key performance indicators
- ISO 20915:2018 Life cycle inventory calculation methodology for steel products
- ISO 20916:2019 In vitro diagnostic medical devices -- Clinical performance studies using specimens from human subjects -- Good study practice
- ISO/IEC 20919:2016 Information technology – Linear Tape File System (LTFS) Format Specification
- ISO/IEC 20922:2016 Information technology – Message Queuing Telemetry Transport (MQTT) v3.1.1
- ISO/IEC 20926:2009 Software and systems engineering - Software measurement - IFPUG functional size measurement method 2009
- ISO/IEC 20933:2016 Information technology - Distributed Application Platforms and Services (DAPS) - Access Systems
- ISO/IEC TR 20943 Information technology – Procedures for achieving metadata registry content consistency
  - ISO/IEC TR 20943-1:2003 Part 1: Data elements
  - ISO/IEC TR 20943-3:2004 Part 3: Value domains
  - ISO/IEC TR 20943-5:2013 Part 5: Metadata mapping procedure
  - ISO/IEC TR 20943-6:2013 Part 6: Framework for generating ontologies
- ISO/IEC 20944 Information technology - Metadata Registries Interoperability and Bindings (MDR-IB)
  - ISO/IEC 20944-1:2013 Part 1: Framework, common vocabulary, and common provisions for conformance
  - ISO/IEC 20944-2:2013 Part 2: Coding bindings
  - ISO/IEC 20944-3:2013 Part 3: API bindings
  - ISO/IEC 20944-4:2013 Part 4: Protocol bindings
  - ISO/IEC 20944-5:2013 Part 5: Profiles
- ISO 20957 Stationary training equipment — Safety requirements and test methods
  - ISO 20957-1:2013 Stationary training equipment — Part 1: General safety requirements and test methods
  - ISO 20957-2:2005 Stationary training equipment — Part 2: Strength training equipment, additional specific safety requirements and test methods
  - ISO 20957-4:2016 Stationary training equipment — Part 4: Strength training benches, additional specific safety requirements and test methods
  - ISO 20957-5:2016 Stationary training equipment — Part 5: Stationary exercise bicycles and upper body crank training equipment, additional specific safety requirements and test methods
  - ISO 20957-6:2005 Stationary training equipment — Part 6: Treadmills, additional specific safety requirements and test methods
  - ISO 20957-7:2005 Stationary training equipment — Part 7: Rowing machines, additional specific safety requirements and test methods
  - ISO 20957-8:2017 Stationary training equipment — Part 8: Steppers, stairclimbers and climbers — Additional specific safety requirements and test methods
  - ISO 20957-9:2016 Stationary training equipment — Part 9: Elliptical trainers, additional specific safety requirements and test methods
  - ISO 20957-10:2017 Stationary training equipment — Part 10: Exercise bicycles with a fixed wheel or without freewheel
- ISO 20958:2013 Condition monitoring and diagnostics of machine systems – Electrical signature analysis of three-phase induction motors
- ISO/IEC 20968:2002 Software engineering - Mk II Function Point Analysis - Counting Practices Manual
- ISO/IEC 20970:2002 Information technology - Programming languages, their environments and system software interfaces - JEFF file format

== ISO 21000 – ISO 21999 ==
- ISO/IEC 21000 Information technology – Multimedia framework (MPEG-21)
- ISO 21001:2018 Educational organizations - Management systems for educational organizations - Requirements with guidance for use (EOMS)
- ISO 21047:2009 Information and documentation - International Standard Text Code (ISTC)
- ISO 21063:2017 Prosthetics and orthotics – Soft orthoses – Uses, functions, classification and description
- ISO 21064:2017 Prosthetics and orthotics – Foot orthotics – Uses, functions classification and description
- ISO 21065:2017 Prosthetics and orthotics – Terms relating to the treatment and rehabilitation of persons having a lower limb amputation
- ISO 21067 Packaging - Vocabulary
  - ISO 21067-1:2016 Part 1: General terms
  - ISO 21067-2:2015 Part 2: Packaging and the environment terms
- ISO/TR 21074:2016 Application of ISO 5725 for the determination of repeatability and reproducibility of precision tests performed in standardization work for chemical analysis of steel
- ISO/TR 21089:2004 Health informatics – Trusted end-to-end information flows
- ISO 21090:2011 Health informatics – Harmonized data types for information interchange
- ISO 21091:2013 Health informatics – Directory services for healthcare providers, subjects of care and other entities
- ISO 21101:2014 Adventure tourism – Safety management systems – Requirements
- ISO/TR 21102:2013 Adventure tourism – Leaders – Personnel competence
- ISO 21103:2014 Adventure tourism – Information for participants
- ISO/IEC 21118:2012 Information technology – Office equipment – Information to be included in specification sheets – Data projectors
- ISO 21127:2014 Information and documentation - A reference ontology for the interchange of cultural heritage information
- ISO/TS 21144:2016 Ergonomics of human-system interaction – Electronic paper display – Indoor use
- ISO 21148:2017 Cosmetics – Microbiology – General instructions for microbiological examination
- ISO 21149:2017 Cosmetics – Microbiology – Enumeration and detection of aerobic mesophilic bacteria
- ISO 21150:2015 Cosmetics – Microbiology – Detection of Escherichia coli
- ISO 21183 Light conveyor belts
  - ISO 21183-2:2005 Part 2: List of equivalent terms
- ISO 21187:2004 Milk – Quantitative determination of bacteriological quality – Guidance for establishing and verifying a conversion relationship between routine method results and anchor method results
- ISO 21188:2006 Public key infrastructure for financial services – Practices and policy framework
- ISO 21210:2012 Intelligent transport systems – Communications access for land mobiles (CALM) – IPv6 Networking
- ISO 21212:2008 Intelligent transport systems – Communications access for land mobiles (CALM) – 2G Cellular systems
- ISO 21213:2008 Intelligent transport systems – Communications access for land mobiles (CALM) – 3G Cellular systems
- ISO 21214:2015 Intelligent transport systems – Communications access for land mobiles (CALM) – Infra-red systems
- ISO 21215:2010 Intelligent transport systems – Communications access for land mobiles (CALM) – M5
- ISO 21216:2012 Intelligent transport systems – Communication access for land mobiles (CALM) – Millimetre wave air interface
- ISO 21217:2014 Intelligent transport systems – Communications access for land mobiles (CALM) – Architecture
- ISO 21218:2013 Intelligent transport systems – Communications access for land mobiles (CALM) – Access technology support
- ISO/TS 21219 Intelligent transport systems – Traffic and travel information (TTI) via transport protocol experts group, generation 2 (TPEG2)
- ISO 21247:2005 Combined accept-zero sampling systems and process control procedures for product acceptance
- ISO 21254 Lasers and laser-related equipment – Test methods for laser-induced damage threshold
  - ISO 21254-1:2011 Part 1: Definitions and general principles
  - ISO 21254-2:2011 Part 2: Threshold determination
  - ISO 21254-3:2011 Part 3: Assurance of laser power (energy) handling capabilities
  - ISO/TR 21254-4:2011 Part 4: Inspection, detection and measurement
- ISO 21289:2008 Mechanical vibration and shock – Parameters to be specified for the acquisition of vibration data
- ISO 21298:2017 Health informatics - Functional and structural roles
- ISO/IEC 21320 Information technology - Document Container File
- ISO 21300:2019 Traditional Chinese medicine — Guidelines and specification for Chinese materia medica
- ISO/IEC 21320-1:2015 Part 1: Core
- ISO 21401:2018 Tourism and related services -- Sustainability management system for accommodation establishments -- Requirements
- ISO/IEC 21407:2001 Information technology – Telecommunications and information exchange between systems – Private Integrated Services Network – Specification, functional model and information flows – Simple dialog supplementary service
- ISO/IEC 21408:2003 Information technology – Telecommunications and information exchange between systems – Private Integrated Services Network – Inter-exchange signalling protocol – Simple dialog supplementary service
- ISO/IEC 21409:2001 Information technology – Telecommunications and information exchange between systems – Corporate telecommunication networks – Signalling interworking between QSIG and H.323 – Generic functional protocol for the support of supplementary services
- ISO/IEC 21410:2001 Information technology – Telecommunications and information exchange between systems – Corporate telecommunication networks – Signalling interworking between QSIG and H.323 – Call transfer supplementary services
- ISO/IEC 21411:2001 Information technology – Telecommunications and information exchange between systems – Corporate telecommunication networks – Signalling interworking between QSIG and H.323 – Call diversion supplementary services
- ISO 21413:2005 Manual methods for the measurement of a groundwater level in a well
- ISO/TR 21414:2016 Hydrometry – Groundwater – Surface geophysical surveys for hydrogeological purposes
- ISO/IEC TS 21425:2017 Programming languages – C++ Extensions for ranges
- ISO 21439:2009 Clinical dosimetry - Beta radiation sources for brachytherapy
- ISO/IEC/IEEE 21450:2010 Information technology - Smart transducer interface for sensors and actuators - Common functions, communication protocols, and Transducer Electronic Data Sheet (TEDS) formats
- ISO/IEC/IEEE 21451 Information technology - Smart transducer interface for sensors and actuators
  - ISO/IEC/IEEE 21451-1:2010 Part 1: Network Capable Application Processor (NCAP) information model
  - ISO/IEC/IEEE 21451-2:2010 Part 2: Transducer to microprocessor communication protocols and Transducer Electronic Data Sheet (TEDS) formats
  - ISO/IEC/IEEE 21451-4:2010 Part 4: Mixed-mode communication protocols and Transducer Electronic Data Sheet (TEDS) formats
  - ISO/IEC/IEEE 21451-7:2011 Part 7: Transducer to radio frequency identification (RFID) systems communication protocols and Transducer Electronic Data Sheet (TEDS) formats
- ISO 21469:2006 - Safety of machinery — Lubricants with incidental product contact — Hygiene requirements
- ISO/IEC 21481:2012 Information technology – Telecommunications and information exchange between systems – Near Field Communication Interface and Protocol -2 (NFCIP-2)
- ISO 21482:2007 Ionizing-radiation warning – Supplementary symbol
- ISO 21484:2017 Nuclear Energy - Fuel technology - Determination of the O/M ratio in MOX pellets by the gravimetric method
- ISO 21485:2013 Textile machinery – Draw frame for cotton spinning – Vocabulary and principles of construction
- ISO 21496-1:2025 Digital photography — Gain map metadata for image conversion
- ISO 21500 Guidance on project management
- ISO 21501-1:2009 Determination of particle size distribution — Single particle light interaction methods — Part 1: Light scattering aerosol spectrometer
- ISO 21501-2:2019 Determination of particle size distribution — Single particle light interaction methods — Part 2: Light scattering liquid-borne particle counter
- ISO 21501-3:2019 Determination of particle size distribution — Single particle light interaction methods — Part 3: Light extinction liquid-borne particle counter
- ISO 21501-4:2018 Determination of particle size distribution — Single particle light interaction methods — Part 4: Light scattering airborne particle counter for clean spaces
- ISO 21502:2020 Project, programme and portfolio management — Guidance on project management
- ISO 21503:2022 Project, programme and portfolio management — Guidance on programme management
- ISO 21504:2015 Project, programme and portfolio management – Guidance on portfolio management
- ISO 21505:2017 Project, programme and portfolio management - Guidance on governance
- ISO 21527 Microbiology of food and animal feeding stuffs – Horizontal method for the enumeration of yeasts and moulds
  - ISO 21527-1:2008 Part 1: Colony count technique in products with water activity greater than 0,95
  - ISO 21527-2:2008 Part 2: Colony count technique in products with water activity less than or equal to 0,95
- ISO 21528 Microbiology of the food chain - Horizontal method for the detection and enumeration of Enterobacteriaceae
  - ISO 21528-1:2017 Part 1: Detection of Enterobacteriaceae
  - ISO 21528-2:2017 Part 2: Colony-count technique
- ISO 21531:2009 Dentistry - Graphical symbols for dental instruments
- ISO 21534:2007 Non-active surgical implants – Joint replacement implants – Particular requirements
- ISO 21535:2007 Non-active surgical implants – Joint replacement implants – Specific requirements for hip-joint replacement implants
- ISO 21536:2007 Non-active surgical implants – Joint replacement implants – Specific requirements for knee-joint replacement implants
- ISO/IEC TS 21544:2018 Programming languages – Extensions to C++ for modules
- ISO/TS 21547:2010 Health informatics – Security requirements for archiving of electronic health records – Principles
- ISO/TR 21548:2010 Health informatics – Security requirements for archiving of electronic health records – Guidelines
- ISO 21549 Health informatics – Patient healthcard data
  - ISO 21549-1:2013 Part 1: General structure
  - ISO 21549-2:2014 Part 2: Common objects
  - ISO 21549-3:2014 Part 3: Limited clinical data
  - ISO 21549-4:2014 Part 4: Extended clinical data
  - ISO 21549-5:2015 Part 5: Identification data
  - ISO 21549-6:2008 Part 6: Administrative data
  - ISO 21549-7:2016 Part 7: Medication data
  - ISO 21549-8:2010 Part 8: Links
- ISO 21567:2004 Microbiology of food and animal feeding stuffs – Horizontal method for the detection of Shigella spp.
- ISO/TS 21609:2014 Road vehicles – (EMC) guidelines for installation of aftermarket radio frequency transmitting equipment
- ISO 21649:2006 Needle-free injectors for medical use – Requirements and test methods
- ISO 21667:2010 Health informatics – Health indicators conceptual framework
- ISO/TR 21707:2008 Intelligent transport systems – Integrated transport information, management and control – Data quality in ITS systems
- ISO/TR 21730:2007 Health informatics – Use of mobile wireless communication and computing technology in healthcare facilities – Recommendations for electromagnetic compatibility (management of unintentional electromagnetic interference) with medical devices
- ISO/HL7 21731:2014 Health informatics – HL7 version 3 – Reference information model – Release 4
- ISO 21748:2017 Guidance for the use of repeatability, reproducibility and trueness estimates in measurement uncertainty evaluation
- ISO/TS 21749:2005 Measurement uncertainty for metrological applications - Repeated measurements and nested experiments
- ISO 21807:2004 Microbiology of food and animal feeding stuffs – Determination of water activity
- ISO/IEC 21827:2008 Information technology - Security techniques - Systems Security Engineering - Capability Maturity Model® (SSE-CMM®)
- ISO 21849:2006 Aircraft and space - Industrial data - Product identification and traceability
- ISO 21871:2006 Microbiology of food and animal feeding stuffs – Horizontal method for the determination of low numbers of presumptive Bacillus cereus – Most probable number technique and detection method
- ISO 21872 Microbiology of the food chain – Horizontal method for the determination of Vibrio spp.
  - ISO 21872-1:2017 Part 1: Detection of potentially enteropathogenic Vibrio parahaemolyticus, Vibrio cholerae and Vibrio vulnificus
- ISO/IEC 21888:2001 Information technology – Telecommunications and information exchange between systems – Private Integrated Services Network – Specification, functional model and information flows – Call Identification and Call Linkage Additional Network Feature
- ISO/IEC 21889:2001 Information technology – Telecommunications and information exchange between systems – Private Integrated Services Network – Inter-exchange signalling protocol – Call Identification and Call Linkage Additional Network Feature
- ISO/IEC TR 21890:2001 Information technology – Telecommunications and information exchange between systems – Interoperation of PISNs with IP networks
- ISO 21930:2017 Sustainability in buildings and civil engineering works — Core rules for environmental product declarations of construction products and services
- ISO/TR 21932:2013 Sustainability in buildings and civil engineering works – A review of terminology
- ISO 21940 Mechanical vibration - Rotor balancing
  - ISO 21940-2:2017 Part 2: Vocabulary
- ISO/TR 21941:2017 Financial services – Third-party payment service providers
- ISO 21969:2009 High-pressure flexible connections for use with medical gas systems
- ISO 21987:2017 Ophthalmic optics – Mounted spectacle lenses
- ISO/IEC 21989:2002 Information technology – Telecommunications and information exchange between systems – Private Integrated Services Network – Specification, functional model and information flows – Short message service
- ISO/IEC 21990:2002 Information technology – Telecommunications and information exchange between systems – Private Integrated Services Network – Inter-exchange signalling protocol – Short message service
- ISO/IEC 21991:2002 Information technology – Telecommunications and information exchange between systems – Corporate Telecommunication Networks – Signalling interworking between QSIG and H.323 – Call completion supplementary services
- ISO/IEC 21992:2003 Information technology – Telecommunications and information exchange between systems – Private Integrated Services Network – Mapping functions for the tunnelling of QSIG through IP networks
- ISO 21998:2020 Interpreting services — Healthcare interpreting — Requirements and recommendations
