= Software intelligence =

Software intelligence is insight into the inner workings and structural condition of software assets produced by software designed to analyze database structure, software framework and source code to better understand and control complex software systems in information technology environments. Similarly to business intelligence (BI), software intelligence is produced by a set of software tools and techniques for the mining of data and the software's inner-structure. Results are automatically produced and feed a knowledge base containing technical documentation and blueprints of the innerworking of applications, and make it available to all to be used by business and software stakeholders to make informed decisions, measure the efficiency of software development organizations, communicate about the software health, prevent software catastrophes.

== History ==
Software intelligence has been used by Kirk Paul Lafler, an American engineer, entrepreneur, and consultant, and founder of Software Intelligence Corporation in 1979. At that time, it was mainly related to SAS activities, in which he has been an expert since 1979.

In the early 1980s, Victor R. Basili participated in different papers detailing a methodology for collecting valid software engineering data relating to software engineering, evaluation of software development, and variations. In 2004, different software vendors in software analysis started using the terms as part of their product naming and marketing strategy.

Then in 2010, Ahmed E. Hassan and Tao Xie defined software intelligence as a "practice offering software practitioners up-to-date and pertinent information to support their daily decision-making processes and Software Intelligence should support decision-making processes throughout the lifetime of a software system". They go on by defining software intelligence as a "strong impact on modern software practice" for the upcoming decades.

== Capabilities ==
Because of the complexity and wide range of components and subjects implied in software, software intelligence is derived from different aspects of software:

- Software composition is the construction of software application components. Components result from software coding, as well as the integration of the source code from external components: Open source, 3rd party components, or frameworks. Other components can be integrated using application programming interface call to libraries or services.
- Software architecture refers to the structure and organization of elements of a system, relations, and properties among them.
- Software flaws designate problems that can cause security, stability, resiliency, and unexpected results. There is no standard definition of software flaws but the most accepted is from The MITRE Corporation where common flaws are cataloged as Common Weakness Enumeration.
- Software grades assess attributes of the software. Historically, the classification and terminology of attributes have been derived from the ISO 9126-3 and the subsequent ISO 25000:2005 quality model.
- Software economics refers to the resource evaluation of software in the past, present, or future to make decisions and to govern.

== Components ==
The capabilities of software intelligence platforms include an increasing number of components:

- Code analyzer to serve as an information basis for other software intelligence components identifying objects created by the programming language, external objects from Open source, third parties objects, frameworks, API, or services
- Graphical visualization and blueprinting of the inner structure of the software product or application considered including dependencies, from data acquisition (automated and real-time data capture, end-user entries) up to data storage, the different layers within the software, and the coupling between all elements.
- Navigation capabilities within components and impact analysis features
- List of flaws, architectural and coding violations, against standardized best practices, cloud blocker preventing migration to a Cloud environment, and rogue data-call entailing the security and integrity of software
- Grades or scores of the structural and software quality aligned with industry-standard like OMG, CISQ or SEI assessing the reliability, security, efficiency, maintainability, and scalability to cloud or other systems.
- Metrics quantifying and estimating software economics including work effort, sizing, and technical debt
- Industry references and benchmarking allowing comparisons between outputs of analysis and industry standards

== User aspect ==
Some considerations must be made in order to successfully integrate the usage of software Intelligence systems in a company. Ultimately the software intelligence system must be accepted and utilized by the users in order for it to add value to the organization. If the system does not add value to the users' mission, they simply don't use it as stated by M. Storey in 2003.

At the code level and system representation, software intelligence systems must provide a different level of abstractions: an abstract view for designing, explaining and documenting and a detailed view for understanding and analyzing the software system.

At the governance level, the user acceptance for software intelligence covers different areas related to the inner functioning of the system as well as the output of the system. It encompasses these requirements:

- Comprehensive: missing information may lead to a wrong or inappropriate decision, as well as it is a factor influencing the user acceptance of a system.
- Accurate: accuracy depends on how the data is collected to ensure fair and indisputable opinion and judgment.
- Precise: precision is usually judged by comparing several measurements from the same or different sources.
- Scalable: lack of scalability in the software industry is a critical factor leading to failure.
- Credible: outputs must be trusted and believed.
- Deploy-able and usable.

== Applications ==
Software intelligence has many applications in all businesses relating to the software environment, whether it is software for professionals, individuals, or embedded software. Depending on the association and the usage of the components, applications will relate to:

- Change and modernization: uniform documentation and blueprinting on all inner components, external code integrated, or call to internal or external components of the software
- Resiliency and security: measuring against industry standards to diagnose structural flaws in an IT environment. Compliance validation regarding security, specific regulations or technical matters.
- Decisions making and governance: Providing analytics about the software itself or stakeholders involved in the development of the software, e.g. productivity measurement to inform business and IT leaders about progress towards business goals.
- Assessment and Benchmarking to help business and IT leaders to make informed, fact-based decision about software.

== Marketplace ==
Software intelligence is a high-level discipline and has been gradually growing covering the applications listed above. There are several markets driving the need for it:

- Application Portfolio Analysis (APA) aiming at improving the enterprise performance.
- Software Assessment for producing the software KPI and improving quality and productivity.
- Software security and resiliency measures and validation.
- Software evolution or legacy modernization, for which blueprinting the software systems are needed nor tools improving and facilitating modifications.
