= Euroflorist =

Swedish flower delivery chain

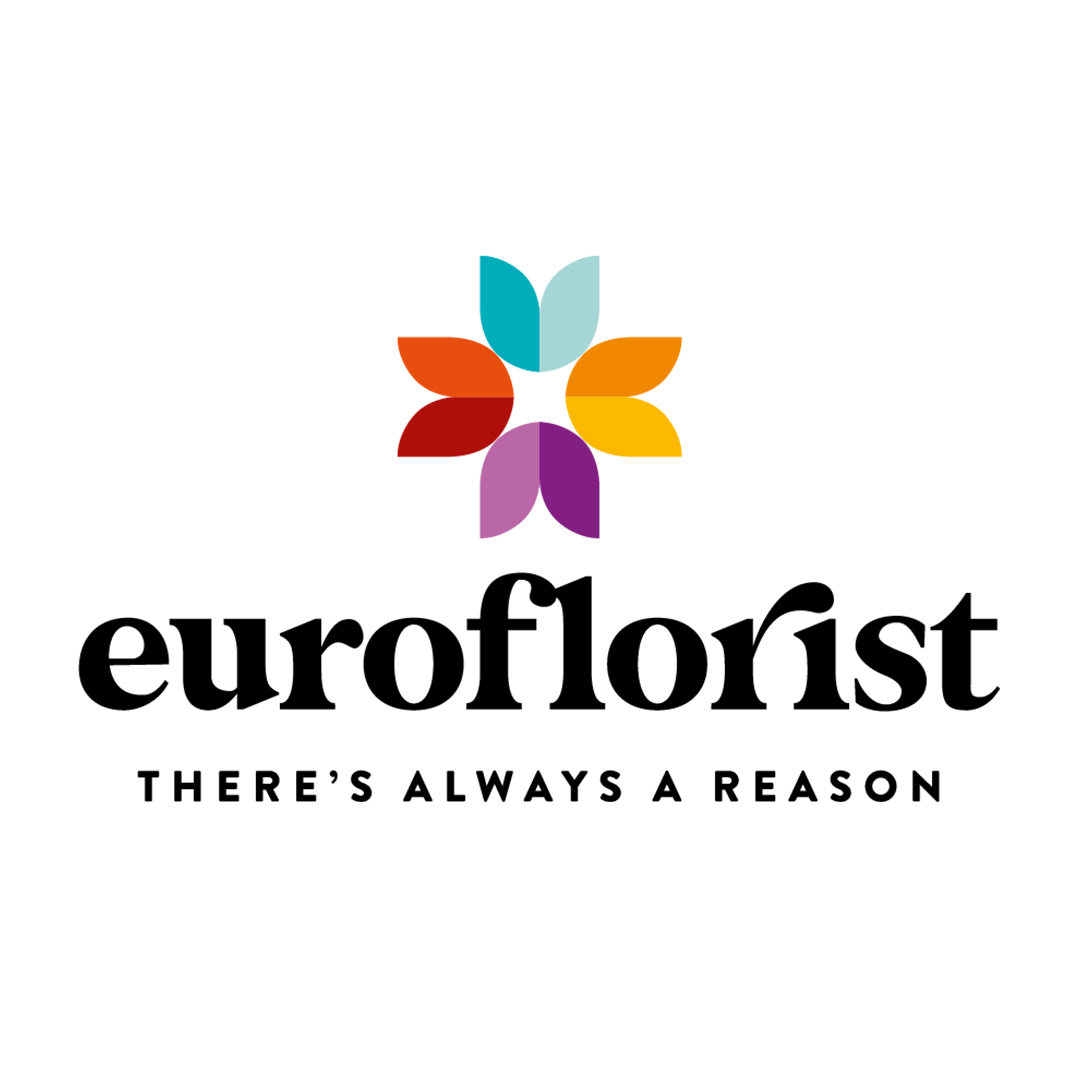
- Type: Limited Company
- Industry: Retail
- Founded: 1982
- Founder: Peter Jungbeck
- Headquarters: Malmö, Sweden
- Key people: Magnus Silfverberg (CEO)
- Products: Flowers
- Revenue: SEK 1.5 billion sek in 2021
- Website: www.euroflorist.com

Euroflorist is a Swedish flower delivery chain founded by Peter Jungbeck in 1982 as Svensk Blomsterförmedling in Malmö, Sweden. Renamed to Euroflorist in 1990, Euroflorist began offering flowers online in 1995. In 2010, Euroflorist acquired the UK based flower delivery service Eflorist/Teleflorist. In November, 2015 Euroflorist bought out its British competitor iFlorist. In 2021, the investor consortium Euroflorist 2.0 AB have jointly acquired 100% of Euroflorist; behind Euroflorist 2.0 AB are Magnus Silfverberg, former CEO of Bisnode and Betsson, and Johan Tjärnberg, CEO of Trustly, and a consortium of co-investors including Richard Båge, Jakob Tolleryd, NEA Partners, Inbox Capital and Tagehus.

== Operations ==
Euroflorist has a network of 3700 florists in the eleven markets they operate in Europe. Euroflorist also has independent companies in Austria, Belgium, Denmark, France, Germany, Norway, Poland, Sweden, Ireland, UK and The Netherlands. In 1984, Euroflorist became a partner of Teleflor International Ltd., a global flower delivery network with over 54,000 florists. In 2021 the company has about 165 employees and more than SEK 1.5 billion in revenues.
