= Diaverum =

Healthcare provider

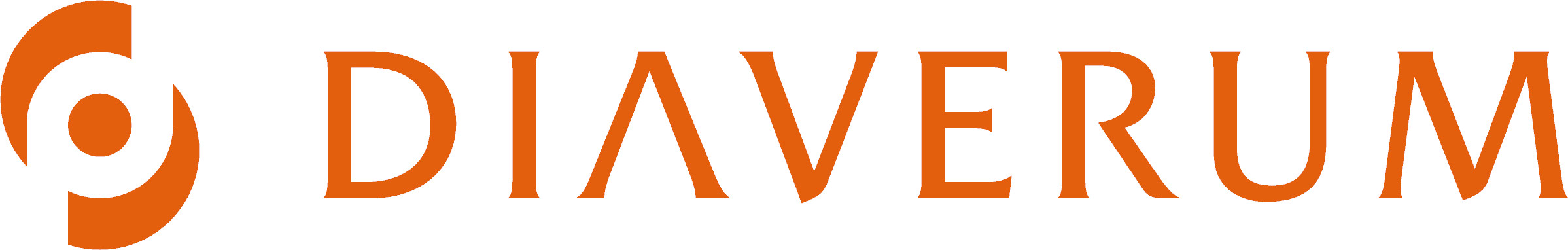
- Company type: Privately held
- Industry: Healthcare
- Key people: Dimitris Moulavasilis, Chief Executive Officer
- Services: Renal care including preventive care, haemodialysis, peritoneal dialysis, home care, coordination of patients’ comorbidities, transplantation services, preventive care, holiday dialysis
- Number of employees: c.13,000 (August 2022)

Diaverum is a Swedish multinational healthcare organisation that provides life-enhancing renal care to patients with chronic kidney disease. The company has over 450 clinics in 24 countries, Europe, Latin America, the Middle East and Asia.

== History ==
Diaverum was originally part of the Swedish company Gambro, founded in Lund, Sweden in 1964. Gambro opened its first dialysis clinic in Lund in 1991. The clinic activities expanded under the name Gambro Healthcare and by 2005 the company managed 150 dialysis clinics worldwide. Gambro Healthcare was divested from Gambro in 2007 and taken over by Bridgepoint Capital, a major private healthcare investor in Europe, and the company management. The name Diaverum was adopted in 2008. Today, Diaverum is led by Dimitris Moulavasilis, President and CEO and his executive team.

It established a contract with IWantGreatCare in 2012 to allow its customers to provide feedback. Responses are collected and analysed in multiple languages for an initial roll out covering the UK and Spain.

Since the Health and Social Care Act 2012 came into force in April 2013 the company has been awarded three British contracts worth at least £150m. In 2020 it won a contract to operate haemodialysis and outpatient services covering East Lancashire, North Lancashire and South Cumbria for seven years, on more accessible sites than were previously provided.

In 2020 the kidney dialysis centers market was expected to continue to grow at a continued Compound Annual Growth Rate of 3.3%. Diaverum is ranked as the global no.3 dialysis clinic operator after Fresenius Medical Care and DaVita Inc.

== Service offer ==
Diaverum describes itself as integrated renal care provider offering renal care from preventive and early stage to renal replacement therapies:

- In-clinic haemodialysis
- Peritoneal dialysis
- Preventive care
- Other medical services such as vascular access

== Medical research ==
Diaverum conducts scientific and clinical research on preventing or minimising the risks for dialysis, making dialysis more effective, finding solutions to minimise risks of dialysis side effects, finding proof of the efficacy of dialysis related drugs and vulnerability of dialysis patients to COVID-19. Its researches has been published in international medical journals such as The Lancet, the New England Journal of Medicine and the Clinical Journal of the American Society of Nephrology.
