= Bridgepoint Group =

UK-based private investment company

Bridgepoint Group plc
- Formerly: Bridgepoint Capital; NatWest Equity Partners
- Type: Public
- Traded as: LSE: BPT; FTSE 250 component
- Industry: Investment company
- Founded: 1984; 42 years ago
- Headquarters: London, England
- Key people: Tim Score (chairman); Raoul Hughes (chief executive)
- Products: Investments, private equity funds
- Revenue: ▲£629.9 million (2025)
- Operating income: ▲£177.8 million (2025)
- Net income: ▼£56.7 million (2025)
- AUM: £38.8 billion (December 2025)
- Subsidiaries: Energy Capital Partners
- Website: www.bridgepoint.eu

Bridgepoint Group plc is a British private investment company listed on the London Stock Exchange as a constituent of the FTSE 250 Index.

== History ==
Bridgepoint was founded as NatWest Equity Partners, a private equity firm part of NatWest. One of its early employees was William Jackson, who joined as a graduate in 1986. The firm was renamed Bridgepoint Capital in May 2000 following a management buyout.

In May 2001, Bridgepoint closed its first fund following its independence from NatWest. The fund closed at €2 billion, and made its first investments in WT Foods, Virgin Active and Hydrex.

The firm closed its Europe II fund in 2001 and its Europe III fund in 2005. Bridgepoint closed its Europe IV fund in 2008 for €4.8 billion.

In 2011, the firm was renamed Bridgepoint Advisers. In March 2015, Bridgepoint closed its latest €4 billion Bridgepoint Europe V fund, bringing to €20.5 billion the amount of committed capital raised to date.

In 2017, Bridgepoint acquired Evac, a Finnish clean energy technology firm, from IK Partners. Bridgepoint would later sell the firm to Altor Equity Partners in 2025, setting Evac's value at more than $600 million.

In August 2018, Dyal Capital Partners acquired a minority stake in Bridgepoint.

In 2021 Bridgepoint closed its £1.56 billion Bridgepoint Development Capital IV fund. In July 2021, Bridgepoint Group was listed to the London Stock Exchange.

In September 2023, it was announced that Bridgepoint would acquire Energy Capital Partners for £835 million.

In January 2026, the company announced it had acquired Interpath, a restructuring company, from H.I.G. Capital, in a deal which valued the company at £800 million.

In April 2026, Bridgepoint secured commitments of over €6 billion at the first close for its fund, Bridgepoint Europe VIII, through investors like the Washington State Investment Board and Minnesota State Board of Investment. The firm began fundraising in October 2025 and set a €7.5 billion fundraising goal for the fund.

== Notable investments ==
- AHT Cooling Systems
- ASK Italian
- Burger King
- CAST
- Care UK
- Deliveroo
- Dennis Eagle purchased August 1999
  sold January 2004 to ABN Amro
- Diaverum
- Equativ
- ERM
- Fat Face
- Hobbycraft
- Humanetics
- Infinitas Learning
- Infront Sports & Media
- Leeds Bradford Airport (now owned by AMP Capital)
- Molton Brown
- Moneycorp
- Monica Vinader
- Nordic Cinema Group
- Pret a Manger
- RoC Skincare
- Rodenstock
- Safestore
- Trustly
- Virgin Active
- Wiggle
- Zizzi

== See also ==
- List of companies based in London
