= Friends and Family Test =

The Friends and Family Test was introduced into the English NHS in 2013. It was a single question survey which asked patients whether they would recommend the NHS service they have received to friends and family who need similar treatment or care.

The friends and family question: “We would like you to think about your experience in the ward where you spent the most time during this stay. How likely are you to recommend our ward to friends and family if they needed similar care or treatment?

Patients could answer as “extremely likely”; “likely”; “neither likely nor unlikely”; “unlikely”; “extremely unlikely”; or “don’t know”.

The Prime Minister announced on 25 May 2012 that the Friends and Family Test would be introduced across the NHS from April 2013. In October 2013 Francis Maude announced the Test would be extended across the NHS and other public services, including further education, Jobcentre Plus and the National Citizen Service.

Publication of the first results in September 2013, based on small numbers of responses, brought complaints that the test was giving a false picture. There were also complaints about the methodology on the grounds that it is susceptible to too many uncontrolled variables for the result to be meaningful.

In November 2013 IWantGreatCare formed a partnership with the NHS Alliance to set up a service which allows patients to rate and review doctors, hospitals and GP practices, and provide the Friends and Family Test which all GPs will be required to provide from December 2014. By February 2015 it had grown into the biggest ever collection of patient opinion in any health service anywhere in the world.

In July 2019 NHS England announced that the test would no longer be required in its present form. There would no longer be a mandatory question about whether the patient or service user would recommend the service from April 2020.

It was suspended by NHS England for GP practices in March 2020 to free up GPs in the COVID-19 pandemic in England. They were told to resume from 1 April 2022. 1,593 GP practices submitted a total of 164,595 patient responses for July 2022. 87% were positive.

== Criticism ==
The test was criticised on a number of grounds. In February 2014 Dr Neil Bacon, chief executive of iWantGreatCare, denounced the implementation of the test, in particular NHS England's refusal to enforce standardisation of methodology to ensure the data could be trusted and truly competitive. Research for the Care Quality Commission carried out by the Picker Institute in 2012 concluded that the test was “not appropriate for use in an NHS setting”. One of the aims of the test is said to be to help patients make informed choices about healthcare providers (though many patients are in no position to make such a choice) and providers are given a rating score on the NHS Choices website. However no explanation is provided about what this rating means. When tested on a group of undergraduate students none were able to accurately understand the meaning of the test headline score.

In July 2014 it was announced that from April 2015 NHS trusts must collect free text comments from patients and collect demographic variables alongside the test data. From December 2014 the test was rolled out to GP practices, and from January 2015, to mental health and community services. The number of responses collect by practices are small. In October 2015 5890 practices collected a total of 181,774 responses from patients - about one patient each day in each practice. Results for each practice can vary wildly from month to month, making the scores very unreliable.

The Guardian published an account from a patient who had suffered a miscarriage and described the use of text messaging in respect of the test as "crass and inappropriate".
