= IWantGreatCare =

iWantGreatCare.org
- Company type: Healthcare IT
- Industry: Monitoring patient experience
- Founder: Dr Neil Bacon
- Headquarters: United Kingdom

IWantGreatCare is a service which allows NHS and private health care patients to rate individual GPs, hospital doctors and nursing staff on the care that they provide.

Launched in July 2008, the service was founded by Dr. Neil Bacon. The controversial launch evoked outrage from many UK doctors and NHS professionals, against a poor system of collecting feedback on the care they provide to patients.

Bacon is a commentator on e-health and patient feedback. In June 2012, he formed part of a UK delegation invited to Washington for the Health Datapalooza, a US health data forum attended by UK health secretary Andrew Lansley, US President Barack Obama and Jon Bon Jovi. The discussion centred on how the two countries can work more closely to make health data a driver for innovation, economic growth and most importantly, better care for patients.

The concept of patient feedback on their experience of care is far less controversial than it once was and the NHS now routinely asks all patients for feedback. As well as being a service for the public, iWantGreatCare supports organisations to collect and analyse patient feedback.

The iWantGreatCare website now contains over 6m reviews left by patients and is the only independent and open review platform that allows patients to rate and review their care.

== Activity ==
In January 2010, the iWantGreatCare service enabled doctors to create and edit their own profiles to gather patient experience, and started to allow dental patients to rate and comment on their dentists.

In 2012, iWantGreatCare announced that it had initiated a service for the Terrence Higgins Trust to help HIV patients find sympathetic doctors and other health care professionals.

In November 2013, the company announced a partnership with the NHS Alliance to set up a service which allows patients to rate and review doctors, hospitals and GP practices, and provide the Friends and Family Test which all GPs will be required to provide to NHS England from December 2014.
