= Moneycorp =

British payment company

TTT Moneycorp Limited
- Type: Private
- Industry: Financial services
- Founded: 1962; 64 years ago
- Headquarters: London, United Kingdom
- Number of locations: 30+
- Key people: Alan Bowkett (Chairman); Velizar Tarashev (Chief Executive)
- Products: Foreign exchange
- Services: International money transfer, Currency exchange, FX Hedging solutions, Global payments API, Multi-currency prepaid card
- Owner: Bridgepoint Capital
- Number of employees: 864 (2020)
- Website: www.moneycorp.com

Moneycorp is a British payment company that provides foreign exchange and global payment services to individual and corporate customers. The company was founded in London in 1979. Its clients include individuals, corporations, and other financial institution. It has a branches in the United Kingdom, North America, Europe, Asia and a number of other countries.

Moneycorp offers payments in over 120 currencies through services that include foreign exchange spot, forward contracts, and option contracts. Moneycorp uses payments technology, which include liquidity providers, API-integrations for mass payments, and a self-service platform.

== History ==
=== Foundation and early years ===
The company was established in 1962 under the name of David Leslie Jewellers (Oxford Street) Limited in London. It changed its name to Town Tickets and Tours Limited in December 1979, then to TTT Moneycorp Limited in April 1993. Since 2008 it has used the brand name moneycorp, dropping the TTT as part of a rebranding.

It operated bureau de change sites and traditional foreign exchange retailer, delivering services for individuals at locations in central London, competing with the local banks. It later expanded its retail division into several airports.

In early 2000, Moneycorp expanded throughout the U.K. as it began to provide international payment capabilities for private clients, followed by a focus on corporate clients. During this time, Moneycorp pivoted towards a focus on technology and payments through licensing and technology upgrades.

In December 2006 the Royal Bank of Scotland (RBS) Special Opportunities Fund became a significant shareholder in the Group, as it purchased a stake from the Shlewet Family Trust, the company's former owners, becoming the sole institutional investor in the Group, with a total shareholding of 99.9% in November 2011. After 8 years moneycorp was bought by Bridgepoint for £212 million.

=== International expansion ===
In 2014, it expanded internationally, obtaining money service business licences across Spain, Romania, and the United States. Moneycorp also obtained banking licences in Brazil and Gibraltar, creating Moneycorp Banco de Cambio and Moneycorp Bank, respectively. A few years later, the company also obtained Money Service Business licences in Hong Kong in 2018 and in Canada in 2020.

In November 2019, Moneycorp became the first of two non-U.S. bank members of the United States Federal Reserve's Foreign Bank International Cash Services (FBICS) program, providing Moneycorp direct access to Federal Reserve U.S. dollar currency services. This relationship with the U.S. Federal Reserve acts as a payments gateway for international financial institutions via Moneycorp’s Financial Institutions Group (FIG).

Moneycorp FIG focuses on enabling safe distribution of banknotes to institutions globally, promoting repatriation and recirculation of banknotes. Through Moneycorp FIG, the company has built a customer base of financial institutions including commercial and central banks.

=== Technical development ===
Throughout its expansion, Moneycorp continued to enhance its technical innovations as well as develop payment technology, while keeping a focus on security and compliance through its financial crime monitoring systems, compliance, and segregation of client funds.

By 2022, Moneycorp stated it had more than 40,000 customers and sent payments to over 190 countries. The company had more than 150 partners internationally.

== Services ==
Throughout the various trading divisions, Moneycorp offers its clients:

- International Payments
- FX Risk Management Strategies
- Mass Payments & APIs
- Multi-currency Wallets
- Wholesale Banknotes
- International Bank Accounts
- Notice Accounts
- Deposit Accounts
- Prepaid Explorer Cards by MasterCard
