= AHT Cooling Systems =

Austrian company

- Company type: Private
- Industry: Manufacturing
- Founded: 1983; 43 years ago
- Headquarters: Rottenmann, Styria, Austria
- Products: Freezers
- Number of employees: appr. 800
- Website: www.aht.at

AHT Cooling Systems is an Austrian company, active in both branches of industrial refrigeration and deep freezing. Its main areas of business are fridges and deep freezers for supermarkets, ice cream freezers and bottle coolers. Daikin acquired AHT in 2019. The company is considered to be a leading producer within the cooling and refrigeration technology market.

The area of refrigeration and deep freezers for supermarkets basically involves plug-in refrigeration and freezer systems and constitutes approximately 60% of the total turnover, which was more than €200 million in 2007.

The company is based in the region of Styria in the middle of Austria and has about 800 employees. Besides its main plant in the city of Rottenmann, AHT runs subsidiaries in the UK, the United States, Germany, Turkey, Thailand, Brazil, China.

== History ==
Founded in 1983, Austria Haustechnik (AHT) was created to succeed the Bauknecht Austria GmbH business, which was registered at the Leoben Commercial Court. After its formation, the organisation made investment in existing machinery, and began expanding its product portfolio to include commercial fridges and freezers for the food retail sector. During the mid-1980s, AHT developed the first fridges and freezers with glass lids, which were a relatively novel concept at the time but would ultimately prove popular.

Almut Graefe joined AHT's management in 1988, which resulted in an extensive expansion of the company in the years to follow. By the start of the 1990s, it had become the only global producer of ‘plug-in commercial refrigeration devices’. It was also during this decade that the first minced meat chest was developed, ushering in the possibility of having minced meat available to buy in supermarkets, provided that authorised inspections were conducted to ensure that all meat hygiene regulations were met.

In 1998, AHT went public, and from 2000, Hans Aage Jörgensen oversaw the business. He was responsible for the introduction of the first CFC-free devices, which were powered by the more environmentally-friendly refrigerant R290 (propane). This same refrigerant is used in all AHT products. During his tenure with the company, Jörgensen was appointed to the Commercial Council for services to the Republic of Austria. This was remarked to be the highest award that can be bestowed upon an entrepreneur by the Austrian government. The honour was awarded in recognition of his contribution to the Styrian economy and its people.

In 2003, the company moved into private equity for a period of fifteen years, commencing with Quadriga Capital, a private equity investor, who acquired AHT Cooling Systems before delisting it from the stock market. In the following years, various changes of ownership took place, with Quadriga Capital transferring ownership of the firm to Equita before resuming control in 2006. From 2007 AHT received investment from the Partners Group. Finally, in 2013, Bridgepoint acquired all shares of AHT for €585 million.

Across the next decade, AHT steadily expanded its operations, establishing production sites in China (2008), Brazil (2014), and the United States (2017). This, in addition to the company's main site in Rottenmann, Austria, gave AHT four production sites for manufacturing refrigerators and freezers.

In 2016, Thomas Babacan became the CEO of AHT, replacing Hans Aage Jörgensen, who moved to the board of directors.

In 2018, it was announced that Bridgepoint was looking to sell the organisation. AHT entered into negotiations for takeover by DAIKIN Europe, a subsidiary of Japanese climate technology company DAIKIN Industries. Following European Commission approval of the takeover in 2019, Martin Krutz was appointed CEO of AHT later that year. Having been employed in several leadership roles at DAIKIN for 28 years, Krutz is now responsible for overseeing the organisation, which operates in 115 countries and holds approximately 33% market share in the plug-in sector.

== Products ==
AHT's main products include refrigeration and cooling solutions for supermarkets, discounters, grocers, beverage and ice cream manufacturers, convenience stores, and gas stations. The company moved to wholly utilising propane R290 as the key refrigerant for its products in 2013, due to its status as having the lowest GWP (Global Warming or Greenhouse Potential). GWP measures the impact a refrigerant has on global warming in comparison to the reference gas carbon dioxide (CO_{2}).

In November 2021, AHT launched their Kalea Freeze Air plug-in R290 freezer – a new device which incorporated in-box technology.
