= DSQI =

DSQI (design structure quality index) is an architectural design metric used to evaluate a computer program's design structure and the efficiency of its modules. The metric was developed by the United States Air Force Systems Command.

The result of DSQI calculations is a number between 0 and 1. The closer to 1, the higher the quality. It is best used on a comparison basis, i.e., with previous successful projects.
