= Teleflorist =

British flower delivery company

Eflorist is the UK element of the European company Euroflorist, it formerly traded as Teleflorist or the British Teleflower Service Limited, and has about 1100 members. Teleflorist was established in 1947 in Hampshire, England, and has remained privately owned.

Teleflorist is now trading as eFlorist and provides same day local flower delivery on orders placed before 3pm on Monday to Saturday.

As of October 2009, Teleflorist was rebranded as eflorist. It was acquired by the larger Euroflorist group in 2010.
