= ISO 20400 =

Standard for sustainable procurement

ISO 20400:2017 Sustainable procurement — Guidance is a standard by the International Organization for Standardization (ISO) that provides guidance to organizations, independent of their activity or size, on integrating sustainability within procurement. It is intended for stakeholders involved in, or impacted by, procurement decisions and processes, complementing ISO 26000, Guidance on social responsibility, by "focusing specifically on the purchasing function".

== History ==
The standard was developed by ISO project committee ISO/PC 277 under the leadership of Jacques Schramm, a French management consultant. Work started in 2013 and the first edition of ISO 20400 was published on 21 April 2017.

== Main features of the standard ==
The ISO 20400:2017 standard is structured as follows:

1. Scope
2. Normative references
3. Terms and definitions
4. Understanding the fundamentals
5. Integrating sustainability into the organization's procurement policy and strategy
6. Organizing the procurement function toward sustainability
7. Integrating sustainability into the procurement process

Researcher Anne Staal notes that within supply chain management, the guidance "necessitates a change in ... buyer-seller relationships", reinforcing the finding of Rentizelas et al. that coercive pressure can “quickly force an industrial sector” to attain a level of sustainable procurement ... but it is not sufficient to develop sustainable practices in suppliers if these organisations themselves do not show initiative".

== Adoption ==
Construction company Balfour Beatty has been identified as the first organisation to undertake a full evaluation using the standard.

== See also ==
- Quality management system
- List of ISO standards
- Conformity assessment
- International Organization for Standardization
