= Capers Jones =

American software engineer

- Citizenship: American
- Education: University of Florida
- Known for: Software project estimation
- Scientific career
- Fields: Software engineering
- Workplaces: IBM, ITT, Software Productivity Research, Namcook Analytics

T. Capers Jones is an American specialist in software engineering methodologies and measurement. He is often associated with the function point model of cost estimation. He is the author of thirteen books.

He was born in St Petersburg, Florida, United States and graduated from the University of Florida, having majored in English. He later became the president and CEO of Capers Jones & Associates and latterly chief scientist emeritus of Software Productivity Research (SPR).

In 2011, he co-founded Namcook Analytics LLC, where he is vice president and chief technology officer (CTO).

He formed his own business in 1984, Software Productivity Research, after holding positions at IBM and ITT. After retiring from Software Productivity Research in 2000, he remains active as an independent management consultant.

He is a Distinguished Advisor to the Consortium for IT Software Quality (CISQ).

== Published Works ==
- Software Development Patterns and Antipatterns, Capers Jones, Routledge, 2021. ISBN 978-1032017228.
- A Guide to Selecting Software Measures and Metrics, Capers Jones, Auerbach Publications, 2017. ISBN 978-1032017228.
- Quantifying Software: Global and Industry Perspectives, Capers Jones, Auerbach Publications, 2017.
- Software Methodologies: A Quantitative Guide, Capers Jones, Auerbach Publications, 2017.
- The Technical and Social History of Software Engineering, Capers Jones, Addison-Wesley, 2013. ISBN 978-0-321-90342-6.
- The Economics of Software Quality, Capers Jones, Olivier Bonsignour and Jitendra Subramanyam, Addison-Wesley Longman, 2011. ISBN 978-0-13-258220-9.
- Software Assessments, Benchmarks, and Best Practices, Capers Jones, Addison-Wesley, 2010. ISBN 978-1032017228.
- Software Engineering Best Practices : lessons from successful projects in the top companies, Capers Jones, Universal Publishers, 2009. ISBN 978-0-07-162161-8.
- Applied Software Measurement: Global Analysis of Productivity and Quality, Capers Jones, McGraw-Hill, 2008.
- The History and Future of Narragansett Bay, Capers Jones, McGraw-Hill, 2008. ISBN 978-1581129113.
- Estimating Software Costs 2nd Edition, Capers Jones, McGraw-Hill, 2007. ISBN 978-0-07-148300-1.
- Software Assessments, Benchmarks and Best Practices, Capers Jones, Addison-Wesley Professional, 2000. ISBN 978-0-201-48542-4.
- Assessment and Control of Software Risks, Capers Jones, Pearson, 1993. ISBN 978-0137414062.
- Programming Productivity, Capers Jones, Mcgraw-Hill, 1986. ISBN 978-0-07-032811-2.
