= IFPUG =

Software metrics association

The International Function Point Users Group (IFPUG) is a US-based organization with worldwide chapters of function point analysis metric software users. It is a non-profit, member-governed organization founded in 1986.

IFPUG owns Function Point Analysis (FPA) as defined in ISO 20296 which specifies the definitions, rules and steps for applying the IFPUG's functional size measurement (FSM) method. FPA can be traced to the work of Allan Albrecht of IBM who pioneered functional sizing in 1979 which derived a functional size of product value distinct and disassociated from lines of code, technology, or software language.

== Functions ==
IFPUG maintains the Function Point Counting Practices Manual (CPM), and the SNAP Assessment Practices Manual, the recognized industry standards for functional and non-functional sizing. IFPUG provides testing and certification for the Certified Function Point Specialist (CFPS), the Certified Function Point Practitioner (CFPP), and the Certified SNAP Practitioner (CSP). Generally, certification is for three years although the CFPS has a certification extension program.

IFPUG offers individual, corporate, countrywide, worldwide, and academic memberships spanning six continents. The annual International Software Measurement & Analysis (ISMA) conferences, access to standards documents, certification support, white papers, the semi-annually produced MetricViews, and educational events represent some of the membership benefits.

FPA allows organizations to understand the functional size of an application prior to its development. As a result, Requests for quotations can be evaluated based on the "richness" of the functionality in addition to its cost and schedule parameters. Several national governments have adopted the use of functional sizing as a prerequisite for bidding on their contracts. Functional sizing can also contribute to determining the level of effort warranted once an application is deployed.

The IFPUG membership, functional and non-functional assets and certifications, and IFPUG partners assist in fulfilling IFPUG's mission: to be the recognized leader in promoting and encouraging the effective management of application software development and maintenance activities through the use of software product and process metrics.

== See also ==
- The Simple Function Point method
- SNAP Points
- COSMIC
