= CISQ =

IT industry group

The Consortium for IT Software Quality (CISQ) is an IT industry group comprising IT executives from the Global 2000, systems integrators, outsourced service providers, and software technology vendors committed to making improvements in the quality of IT application software.

== Overview ==
Jointly organized by the Software Engineering Institute (SEI) at Carnegie Mellon University and the Object Management Group (OMG), CISQ is designed to be a neutral forum in which customers and suppliers of IT application software can develop an industry-wide agenda of actions for defining, measuring, and improving IT software quality.

== History ==
CISQ was launched in August 2009 by 24 founders including SEI and OMG. The founders of CISQ are Paul D. Nielsen, Director and CEO of SEI and Richard Mark Soley, Chairman and CEO of OMG. Bill Curtis, the co-author of the CMM framework is CISQ's first Director. Software measurement and productivity expert Capers Jones is a CISQ Distinguished Advisor.

In September 2012, CISQ published its standard measures for evaluating and benchmarking the reliability, security, performance efficiency, and maintainability of IT software.

In January 2013, OMG adopted Automated Function Point specifications.

In May 2013 CISQ reached 500 members.

In December 2013, WIPRO become the fourth major sponsor to join the list of industry participants investing in the completion and adoption of CISQ standards in the IT industry.

== See also ==
- ISO/IEC 9126
