= Trustly =

Swedish financial technology company

- Company type: Private
- Founded: 2008; 18 years ago
- Headquarters: Stockholm
- Country of origin: Sweden
- Founders: Carl Wilson, Joel Jakobsson, Lukas Gratte
- Chairperson: Morten Hübbe
- CEO: Johan Tjärnberg
- Industry: Financial services
- Revenue: 2.68 billion SEK ($265 million) (2023)
- Employees: 1000 (2023)
- Website: trustly.com
- Current status: Active

Trustly AB (publ), known as Trustly, is a Swedish fintech company founded in 2008 that specializes in open banking payment solutions. Trustly enables customers to conduct transactions directly from their bank accounts, offering an alternative to traditional card-based payment systems. The company claims its network supports 12,000 banks and connects with 650 million consumers globally.

Trustly serves a variety of industries and is used by over 9,000 companies globally, including notable clients such as PayPal, DraftKings, and eBay. In 2020, Trustly expanded operations to Australia and Canada, complementing its presence in Europe and the United States.

In 2023, Trustly reported revenues of $265 million, a 14% increase from 2022, and processed $58 billion in transactions, reflecting the broader growth of open banking solutions.

== History ==
The company was originally named Glue Finance and was founded in 2008 in Stockholm, Sweden. Trustly signed contracts with its first online retailers the same year. By 2010, the company opened its first international office in Malta and processed over one million transactions. Trustly introduced a second-generation platform in 2011, followed by a strategic investment from Alfvén & Didrikson, which acquired a 25% stake.

In 2014, Trustly formed partnerships with Groupon and PayPal while securing a €23 million investment from Bridgepoint Capital.

In 2016, Trustly launched "Pay N Play," a payment solution designed to streamline online transactions in the gambling sector. By 2022, over 200 brands supported the solution.

In 2019, Trustly merged with Silicon Valley–based PayWithMyBank, enabling global merchants to accept online banking payments across Europe and the U.S.

Trustly has continued to expand its services through acquisitions, including Ecospend in 2022 and SlimPay in 2023.

== Security ==
Trustly is a licensed payment institution authorized and supervised by the Swedish Financial Supervisory Authority in the EU and EEA, and by the Financial Conduct Authority in the UK. In the U.S., Trustly complies with state-specific regulations.

Trustly employs two-factor authentication to enhance security during transactions.

== Criticism ==
In 2013, a competing bank accused Trustly of accessing more customer data than necessary, including information about mutual funds and shareholdings, which allegedly compromised banking confidentiality. Similar concerns emerged in 2016 in Poland when PayPal adopted Trustly's services, with critics claiming this practice violated PayPal's own policies.

In 2018, the Finnish Financial Supervisory Authority ruled that Trustly's screen-scraping practices were illegal. Trustly has maintained that its practices are governed by clear agreements and regulatory oversight.

In February 2022, the Swedish Financial Supervisory Authority (Finansinspektionen, FI) issued a formal warning to Trustly and imposed a fine of SEK 130 million due to serious deficiencies in the company's anti-money laundering (AML) practices. According to FI the shortcomings created increased risk of misuse of Trustly's payment services for criminal activities. FI noted corrective actions taken by Trustly, but maintained that the regulatory breaches warranted both a warning and a significant penalty.
