= Health Creation Alliance =

- Headquarters: London
- Chief Executive Officer, Merron Simpson

The Health Creation Alliance, formerly the NHS Alliance, is an independent leadership body representing progressive providers of care outside hospitals. It is neither a professional body nor a trade union.

Known as the New NHS Alliance before 2021, the Health Creation Alliance focuses on health creation, championing the '3Cs' of control, contact, and communication.

It represents all providers of primary care including general practice; community eye, hearing and foot care; community pharmacy; dentistry and physiotherapy; and out-of-hours and emergency services. The Health Creation Alliance also represents determinants of health outcomes like housing organisations or those with an interest in maintaining good health such as local authorities and health and wellbeing boards.

An early exponent of clinical commissioning groups, the Health Creation Alliance now works closely with providers and communities to identify and share the solutions needed to sustain the NHS. It also focuses on providing practical support to help drive the innovation it endorses.

The Health Creation Alliance works with several strategic partners with whom it co-produces and delivers important think and action papers, reports, programmes and summits.

Two publications, Breaking Boundaries and Beyond: A Manifesto for Primary Care (March 2013) and Think Big, Act Now: Creating a Community of Care (October 2014) were early articulations of NHS England's Five Year Forward View, describing the requirement to dissolve silos and tensions within the system and work towards more lateral organisations, what it calls 'Communities of Care', equivalent to NHS England's Multispecialty Community Providers.

Other networks include people-powered improvement, general practice, new providers, urgent care and housing.
