= Function point =

Unit of measurement

The function point is a "unit of measurement" to express the amount of business functionality an information system (as a product) provides to a user. Function points are used to compute a functional size measurement (FSM) of software. The cost (in dollars or hours) of a single unit is calculated from past projects.

== Standards ==
There are several recognized standards and/or public specifications for sizing software based on Function Point.

1. ISO Standards

- FiSMA: ISO/IEC 29881:2010 Information technology – Systems and software engineering – FiSMA 1.1 functional size measurement method.
- IFPUG: ISO/IEC 20926:2009 Software and systems engineering – Software measurement – IFPUG functional size measurement method.
- Mark-II: ISO/IEC 20968:2002 Software engineering – Ml II Function Point Analysis – Counting Practices Manual
- Nesma: ISO/IEC 24570:2018 Software engineering – Nesma functional size measurement method version 2.3 – Definitions and counting guidelines for the application of Function Point Analysis
- COSMIC: ISO/IEC 19761:2011 Software engineering. A functional size measurement method.
- OMG: ISO/IEC 19515:2019 Information technology — Object Management Group Automated Function Points (AFP), 1.0

The first five standards are implementations of the over-arching standard for Functional Size Measurement ISO/IEC 14143. The OMG Automated Function Point (AFP) specification, led by the Consortium for IT Software Quality, provides a standard for automating the Function Point counting according to the guidelines of the International Function Point User Group (IFPUG) However, the current implementations of this standard have a limitation in being able to distinguish External Output (EO) from External Inquiries (EQ) out of the box, without some upfront configuration.

== Introduction ==
Function points were defined in 1979 in Measuring Application Development Productivity by Allan J. Albrecht at IBM. The functional user requirements of the software are identified and each one is categorized into one of five types: outputs, inquiries, inputs, internal files, and external interfaces. Once the function is identified and categorized into a type, it is then assessed for complexity and assigned a number of function points. Each of these functional user requirements maps to an end-user business function, such as a data entry for an Input or a user query for an Inquiry. This distinction is important because it tends to make the functions measured in function points map easily into user-oriented requirements, but it also tends to hide internal functions (e.g. algorithms), which also require resources to implement.

There is currently no ISO recognized FSM Method that includes algorithmic complexity in the sizing result. Recently there have been different approaches proposed to deal with this perceived weakness, implemented in several commercial software products. The variations of the Albrecht-based IFPUG method designed to make up for this (and other weaknesses) include:

- Early and easy function points – Adjusts for problem and data complexity with two questions that yield a somewhat subjective complexity measurement; simplifies measurement by eliminating the need to count data elements.
- Engineering function points – Elements (variable names) and operators (e.g., arithmetic, equality/inequality, Boolean) are counted. This variation highlights computational function. The intent is similar to that of the operator/operand-based Halstead complexity measures.
- Bang measure – Defines a function metric based on twelve primitive (simple) counts that affect or show Bang, defined as "the measure of true function to be delivered as perceived by the user." Bang measure may be helpful in evaluating a software unit's value in terms of how much useful function it provides, although there is little evidence in the literature of such application. The use of Bang measure could apply when re-engineering (either complete or piecewise) is being considered, as discussed in Maintenance of Operational Systems—An Overview.
- Feature points – Adds changes to improve applicability to systems with significant internal processing (e.g., operating systems, communications systems). This allows accounting for functions not readily perceivable by the user, but essential for proper operation.
- Weighted Micro Function Points – One of the newer models (2009) which adjusts function points using weights derived from program flow complexity, operand and operator vocabulary, object usage, and algorithm.
- Fuzzy Function Points - Proposes a fuzzy and gradative transition between low x medium and medium x high complexities

== Contrast ==
The use of function points in favor of lines of code seek to address several additional issues:

- The risk of "inflation" of the created lines of code, and thus reducing the value of the measurement system, if developers are incentivized to be more productive. FP advocates refer to this as measuring the size of the solution instead of the size of the problem.
- Lines of Code (LOC) measures reward low level languages because more lines of code are needed to deliver a similar amount of functionality to a higher level language. C. Jones offers a method of correcting this in his work.
- LOC measures are not useful during early project phases where estimating the number of lines of code that will be delivered is challenging. However, Function Points can be derived from requirements and therefore are useful in methods such as estimation by proxy.

== Criticism ==
Albrecht observed in his research that Function Points were highly correlated to lines of code, which has resulted in a questioning of the value of such a measure if a more objective measure, namely counting lines of code, is available. In addition, there have been multiple attempts to address perceived shortcomings with the measure by augmenting the counting regimen. Others have offered solutions to circumvent the challenges by developing alternative methods which create a proxy for the amount of functionality delivered.

== See also ==
- COCOMO (Constructive Cost Model)
- Comparison of development estimation software
- COSMIC functional size measurement
- Mark II method
- Object point
- Software development effort estimation
- Software Sizing
- Source lines of code
- Use Case Points
- The Simple Function Point method
