= Wirth's law =

Adage on computer performance

Wirth's law is an adage on computer performance which states that software is getting slower more rapidly than hardware is becoming faster.

The adage is named after Niklaus Wirth, a computer scientist who discussed it in his 1995 article "A Plea for Lean Software".

== History ==
Wirth attributed the saying to Martin Reiser, who in the preface to his book on the Oberon System wrote: "The hope is that the progress in hardware will cure all software ills. However, a critical observer may observe that software manages to outgrow hardware in size and sluggishness." Other observers had noted this for some time before; indeed, the trend was becoming obvious as early as 1987.

He states two contributing factors to the acceptance of ever-growing software as: "rapidly growing hardware performance" and "customers' ignorance of features that are essential versus nice-to-have". Enhanced user convenience and functionality supposedly justify the increased size of software, but Wirth argues that people are increasingly misinterpreting complexity as sophistication, that "these details are cute but not essential, and they have a hidden cost". As a result, he calls for the creation of "leaner" software and pioneered the development of Oberon, a software system developed between 1986 and 1989 based on nothing but hardware. Its primary goal was to show that software can be developed with a fraction of the memory capacity and processor power usually required, without sacrificing flexibility, functionality, or user convenience.

== Other names ==
The law was restated in 2009 and attributed to Google co-founder Larry Page. It has been referred to as Page's law. The first use of that name is attributed to fellow Google co-founder Sergey Brin at the 2009 Google I/O Conference.

Other common forms use the names of the leading hardware and software companies of the 1990s, Intel and Microsoft, or their CEOs, Andy Grove and Bill Gates, for example "What Intel giveth, Microsoft taketh away" and Andy and Bill's law: "What Andy giveth, Bill taketh away".

Gates's law ("The speed of software halves every 18 months") is an anonymously coined variant on Wirth's law, its name referencing Bill Gates, co-founder of Microsoft. It is an observation that the speed of commercial software generally slows by 50% every 18 months, thereby negating all the benefits of Moore's law. This could occur for a variety of reasons: feature creep, code cruft, developer laziness, lack of funding, forced updates, forced porting (to a newer OS or to support a new technology) or a management turnover whose design philosophy does not coincide with the previous manager.

May's law, named after David May, is a variant stating: "Software efficiency halves every 18 months, compensating Moore's law".

== See also ==
- Andy and Bill's law
- Code bloat
- Enshittification
- Feature creep
- Jevons paradox
- Minimalism (computing)
- No Silver Bullet
- Parkinson's law
- Software bloat
- Waste
