= Software bloat =

Situation of degraded computer performance

Software bloat is when successive versions of a computer program become noticeably slower, require more CPU processing power, more RAM allocation, disk space, battery power, or higher hardware specifications than the previous version, while the software's quality stagnates or decreases. The term is also used to describe the presence of feature-creep, or an increasing complexity of the source code. The term is subjective, being based on the perceptions of the end users; however, certain metrics of software bloat can be measured objectively, such as execution speed or binary size. It's typically caused by either adding new features to the software, or not properly optimizing the software.

Actual (measurable) bloat can occur due to de-emphasising algorithmic efficiency in favour of other concerns like developer productivity, or possibly through the introduction of new layers of abstraction like a virtual machine or other scripting engine for the purposes of convenience when developer constraints are reduced. The perception of improved developer productivity, in the case of practising development within virtual machine environments, comes from the developers no longer taking resource constraints and usage into consideration during design and development; this allows the product to be completed faster but it results in increases to the end user's hardware requirements and/or compromised performance as a result.

The term "bloatware" is also used to describe unwanted pre-installed software or bundled programs.

== Types of bloat ==
=== Program bloat ===
In computer programming, code bloat refers to the presence of program code (source code or machine code) that is unnecessarily long, slow, or otherwise wasteful of resources.

=== Feature creep ===
Feature creep is the tendency for a product, project, or system to gradually expand beyond its original scope by adding more and more features over time. In the context of computer programs, this can result in excessive disk space usage, loss of performance and the program being harder to use and understand by most end users.

=== Bloatware ===
Bloatware is the name for pre-installed software or bundled programs on computers and devices, installed at the factory by original equipment manufacturers (OEMs). The OEMs claim these programs are added for user convenience, but often the OEMs are paid by the software sellers of the bloatware to package their products and thus are not concerned whether or not the programs are desired or used by the consumer. Bloatware programs take up storage space on new devices, can slow down performance, and may be uninstallable.

== Causes ==
=== Software inefficiency ===
Software developers involved in the industry during the 1970s had severe limitations on processing power, disk space and memory. Every byte and clock cycle was taken into account, and much work went into fitting the programs into available resources. Achieving this efficiency was one of the highest values of computer programmers, and the best programs were often called "elegant", a term used by mathematicians to describe a proof which is tidy, parsimonious and powerful.

By the 21st century, the situation had reversed. Resources were perceived as cheap, and rapidity of coding and headline features for marketing seen as priorities. In part, this is because technological advances have since increased processing capacity and storage density by orders of magnitude, while reducing the relative costs by similar orders of magnitude (see Moore's law and Jevons paradox). Additionally, the spread of computers through all levels of business and home life has produced a software industry many times larger than it was in the 1970s. Programs are now usually churned out by teams, directed by committees in software development studios (also known as software houses or software factories) where each programmer works on only a part of the whole, on one or more subroutines. When different programmers work on different parts of a software, it's common for the parts to not work together as optimally than if they were both designed by a single person.

Programmers working for software companies are often pressured to push their code to production as quickly as possible, or are given unrealistic deadlines to finish the code. This leads programmers to spend time ensuring the stability of the code for production, while not spending enough time optimizing the code. Also, the software industry has transitioned overtime to using higher level programming languages, such as Python and Java, which provide abstractions to make the code quicker to write and less error prone, at the expense of speed and efficiency. This association between higher level programming languages and software bloat, or saying a programming language "is bloat", has become a meme in the programming online community (example).

Finally, software development tools and approaches often result in changes throughout a program to accommodate each feature, leading to a large-scale inclusion of code which affects the main operation of the software, and is required in order to support functions that themselves may be only rarely used. In particular, the advances in resources available have led to tools which allow easier development of code, again with less priority given to end efficiency.

Another cause of bloat is independently competing standards and products, which can create a demand for integration. There are now more operating systems, browsers, protocols, and storage formats than there were before, causing bloat in programs due to interoperability issues. For example, a program that once could only save in text format is now required to save in HTML, XML, XLS, CSV, PDF, DOC, and other formats.

Niklaus Wirth has summed up the situation in Wirth's law, which states that software speed is decreasing more quickly than hardware speed is increasing.

In his 2001 essay Strategy Letter IV: Bloatware and the 80/20 Myth, Joel Spolsky argues that while 80% of the users only use 20% of the features (a variant on the Pareto principle), each one uses different features. Thus, "lite" software editions turn out to be useless for most, as they miss the one or two special features that are present in the "bloated" version. Spolsky sums the article with a quote by Jamie Zawinski referring to the Mozilla Application Suite (ultimately debloated as separate apps, of which the Firefox web browser is the only significant survivor):

"Convenient though it would be if it were true, Mozilla is not big because it's full of useless crap. Mozilla is big because your needs are big. Your needs are big because the Internet is big. There are lots of small, lean web browsers out there that, incidentally, do almost nothing useful. [...] But being a shining jewel of perfection was not a goal when we wrote Mozilla."

Software bloat may also be a symptom of the second-system effect, described by Fred Brooks in The Mythical Man-Month.

=== Bloatware ===
“Bloatware" is software that has become bloated through inefficiency or accretion of features as outlined above. The term is also commonly used for preinstalled software bundled on a device, usually by the hardware manufacturer, that is mostly unwanted by the purchaser.

The term may also be applied to the accumulation of unwanted and unused software elements that remain after partial and incomplete uninstallation. These elements may include whole programs, libraries, associated configuration information, or other data. Performance may deteriorate overall as a result of such remnants, as the unwanted software or software components can occupy both hard disk memory and RAM, waste processing time, add disk I/O, and cause delays at system startup and shutdown. In the worst cases, the leftover software may interfere with the correct operation of wanted software.

On Android devices some of the bloatware can be disabled from a user account with ADB, although this doesn't remove the application and will still take disk space, it won't run and slow down the system. By unlocking the bootloader, users can remove the bloatware's files, install a custom firmware or gain root privileges which allows the app to be fully uninstalled.

== Examples ==
Comparison of Microsoft Windows minimum hardware requirements (for IA-32 [until Windows 11])
Year	Windows version	Processor	Memory	Hard disk
1995	Windows 95	25 MHz	4 MB	~50 MB
1998	Windows 98	66 MHz	16 MB	~200 MB
1999	Windows 2000	133 MHz	32 MB	650 MB
2001	Windows XP	233 MHz	64 MB	1.5 GB
2006	Windows Vista	800 MHz	512 MB	15 GB
2009	Windows 7	1 GHz	1 GB	16 GB
2012	Windows 8	1 GHz	1 GB	16 GB
2015	Windows 10	1 GHz	1 GB	32 GB
2021	Windows 11	1 GHz; 64-bit Dual-Core	4 GB	64 GB

Apple's iTunes has been accused of being bloated by efforts to turn it from a simple media player to an e-commerce and advertising platform, with former PC World editor Ed Bott accusing the company of hypocrisy in its advertising attacks on Windows for similar practices. In 2019, Apple announced the impending closure of the program, a move described by a commentator from The Guardian as being "long overdue", stating that the program had "become baroquely bloated, a striking anomaly for a company that prides itself on elegant and functional design."

Microsoft Windows has also been criticized as being bloated – with reference to Windows Vista and discussing the new, greatly slimmed down Windows 7 core components, Microsoft engineer Eric Traut commented that "This is the core of Windows 7. This is a collection of components that we've taken out. A lot of people think of Windows as this really large, bloated operating system, and that may be a fair characterization, I have to admit. It is large. It contains a lot of stuff in it. But at its core, the kernel and the components that make up the very core of the operating system actually is pretty streamlined." Ed Bott also expressed skepticism, noting that nearly every operating system that Microsoft has ever sold has been criticized as "bloated" on first release, even those now regarded as the exact opposite, such as MS-DOS. Quoting Paul Thurrott, Bott agreed that the bloat stems from numerous enterprise-level features included in the operating system that were largely irrelevant to the average home user.

CD- and DVD-burning applications such as Nero Burning ROM have become criticized for being bloated. Superfluous features not specifically tailored to the end user are sometimes installed by default through express setups.

A number of technology blogs have also covered the issue of increased bloatware on cell phones. However, they refer to a different issue, specifically that of wireless carriers loading phones with software that, in many cases, cannot be easily, if at all, deleted. This has been most frequently cited with respect to Android devices, although this phenomenon exists on phones running many other operating systems.

Some of the most popular current messaging apps, which were previously only focused on instant messaging, have been criticized for being bloated due to feature creep. WeChat during its transformation into a super-app added additional features such as games, subscription services, WeChat Pay e-wallet, a news aggregator, an e-commerce hub, an e-government feature, a cinema booking system, a restaurant finder and a ridesharing company, which has increased the size of the app from 2 MB in 2011 to more than 750 MB in 2025. Facebook Messenger, which has been separated from the Facebook app, is similarly criticized for adding additional features such as games, bots and features which copied from Snapchat such as Messenger Day (Stories), face filters, a camera with the ability to edit photos, doodle draw and added emojis and stickers. In January 2018, the head of Facebook Messaging, David A. Marcus, admitted that the app itself is extremely bloated and promised to redesign the whole app to remove unnecessary features and streamline it. The redesigned and streamlined Facebook Messenger app was announced in October 2018, in which its features are reduced to messaging, stories, discover tab and camera.

== Alternatives ==
Some applications, such as GIMP, and software with additional functionality from plug-ins, use extensions or add-ons which are downloaded separately from the main application. These can be created by either the software developer or by third-party developers. Plug-ins, extensions, and add-ons add extra functionality which might have otherwise been packaged in the main program.

Allowing these plug-ins, extensions, and/or add-ons reduces the space used on any one machine, because even though the application, the "plug-in interface", and all the plug-ins combined are larger than the same functionality compiled into one monolithic application, it allows each user to install only the particular add-on features they require, rather than forcing every user to install a much larger monolithic application that includes all of the available features. This results in a "stripped-down" or "out-of-the-box" application that is delivered in a compact package yet is ready for users to add any missing functionality.

Open source software may use a similar technique using preprocessor directives to include features at compile time selectively. This is easier to implement and more secure than a plugin system, but has the disadvantage that a user who wants a specific set of features must compile the program from source.

Sometimes software becomes bloated because of "creeping featurism" (Zawinski's law of software envelopment). One way to reduce that kind of bloat is described by the Unix philosophy of "writing programs that do one thing and do it well," and breaking what would be a single, complicated piece of software into numerous simpler components which can be chained together using pipes, shell scripts, or other forms of interapplication communication.

== Security concerns ==
=== Software bloat as a vulnerability ===
Software bloat may induce more vulnerabilities due to the increased difficulty in managing a large volume of code and dependencies, and consequential difficulty navigating the code in order to find and resolve vulnerabilities.

=== Bloatware as a vulnerability ===
Although bloatware is not a form of malware and is not designed for malicious purposes, bloatware may introduce some vulnerabilities unintentionally and may cause the user's computer to have a higher risk for infection by computer viruses or ransomware.

== See also ==
=== Theory ===
- Code bloat
- Feature creep
- Planned obsolescence
- Software cruft
- Software rot
- Technical Debt
- Wirth's law
- Zawinski's law of software envelopment

=== Computing ===
- Lightweight software
- Minimalism (computing)
- Shovelware
- Software suite
