= Second System =

Second System may refer to:

- IND Second System, a proposed New York City Subway expansion 1929–1940)
- Second-system effect in computer programming
- Second system of seacoast defense, New York Harbor defense fortifications
