= Stakhanovite movement =

Soviet work ethos equating labor with heroism

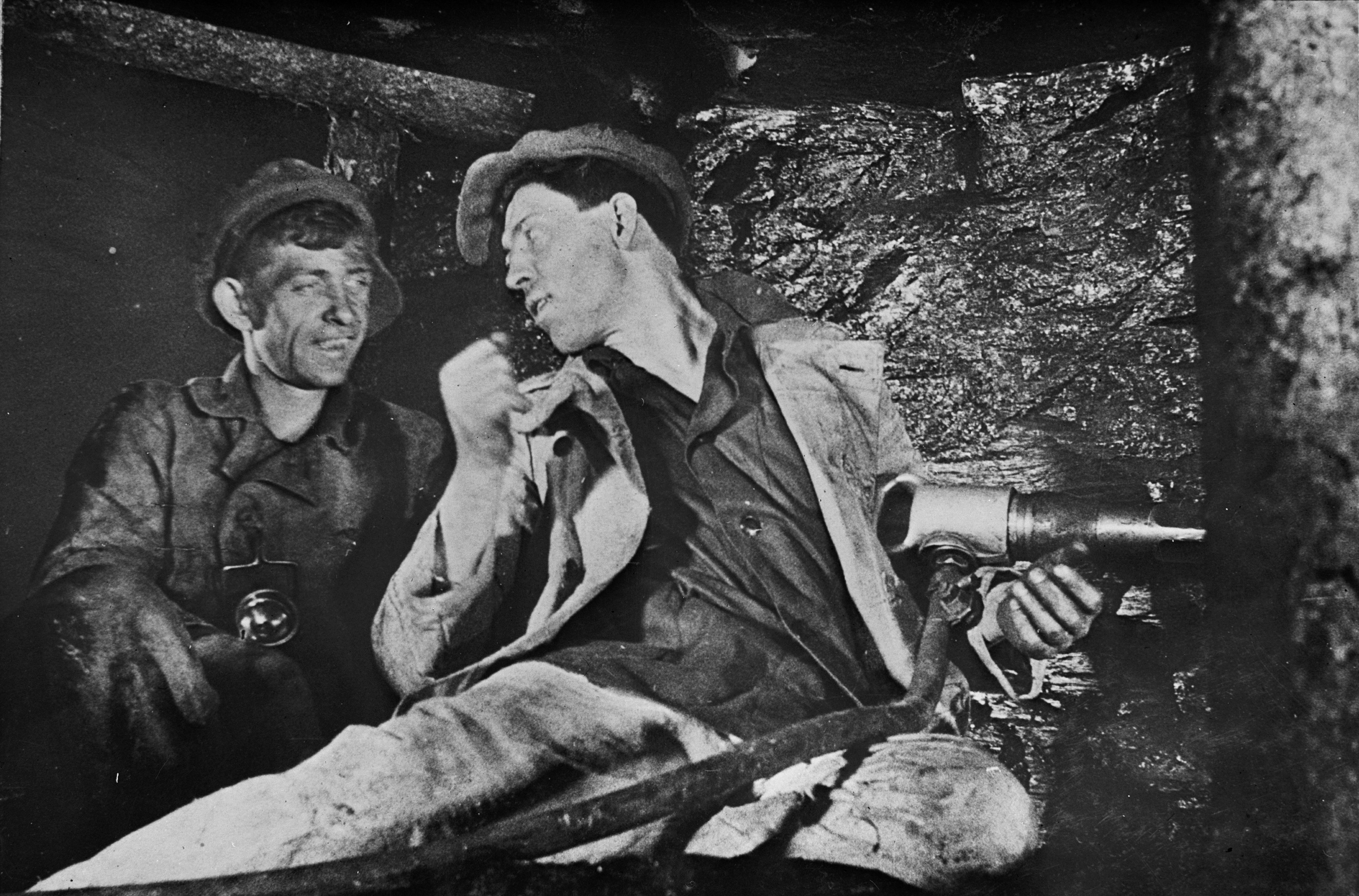
Aleksei Grigorievich Stakhanov with a fellow miner

The Stakhanovite movement (Note: Russian: стаха́новское движе́ние, romanized: stakhánovskoye dvizhéniye) was a mass cultural movement for workers established by the Communist Party in the 1930s Soviet Union. Its promoters encouraged the rationalization of workplace processes—i.e., increased production goals—while promoting socialist emulation.

The Stakhanovites (Note: Russian: стаха́новцы, romanized: stakhánovtsy) modeled themselves after the mythic productivity of the Russian coal miner Alexei Stakhanov. As frontline workers they took pride in their aspirations to work harder and more efficiently than was required by ad hoc norms; thereby they saw themselves as contributing to the common good and strengthening the socialist state. The Party started the movement in the coal industry and then applied it to other industries across the Soviet Union. Initially popular, it eventually encountered resistance as the pressures for greater productivity placed increased and unrealistic demands on workers.

== History ==
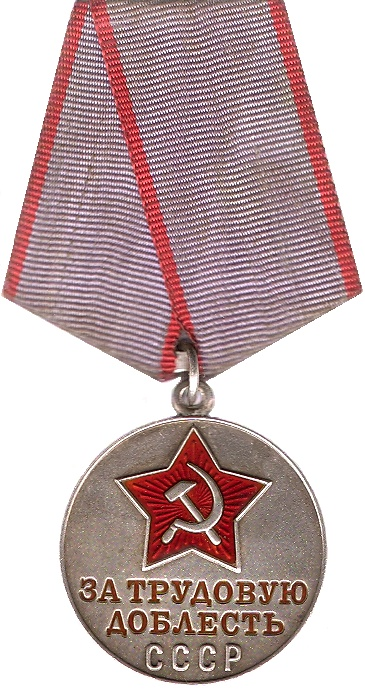
USSR Medal "For Labour Valour"

The Stakhanovite movement was established and developed by the Soviet Communist Party; it was started in 1935 during the second Soviet five-year plan—as a new stage of sponsored socialist competition/socialist emulation, and as the continuation of the Party's rapid industrialization initiative and its forced collectivization of farming begun seven years prior (1928). The movement took its name from Aleksei Grigorievich Stakhanov, who reportedly, on August 31, 1935, mined 102 tons of coal in less than 6 hours—some 14 times his shift quota. However, competitive Stakhanovite followers soon would break his record. On February 1, 1936, it was reported that Nikita Izotov had mined 640 tons of coal in a single shift.

Stakhanovite programs were quickly applied by the Party to other industries of the Soviet Union. Pioneers of the movement included Alexander Busygin (automobile industry), Nikolai Smetanin (shoe industry), Dusya Vinogradova (Note: Namesake of the Vinogradovites (виноградовцы).) and Marusya Vinogradova (textile industry), Ivan I. Gudov (machine tool industry), Vasiliy S. Musinsky (timber industry), Pyotr Krivonos (railroad), Pasha Angelina (agriculture), (Note: Honored as the first Soviet woman to operate a tractor.) Konstantin Borin and Maria S. Demchenko (agriculture), and many others.

On November 14–17, 1935, the first All-Union Stakhanovite Conference convened in Moscow at the Kremlin. The conference emphasized the outstanding role of the Stakhanovite movement in the socialist reconstruction of the national economy. In December 1935 the plenum of the Communist Party's Central Committee specifically discussed aspects of developing industry and transport systems in light of the Stakhanovite movement.

Pursuing the objectives of the recent Party plenum, the Soviets organized a wide network of industrial training, specifically creating courses for foremen of socialist labor to initiate and support the movement in the various industry. They introduced Stakhanovite contests in many industries to find the best workers and encourage competition among them. In 1936 a number of industrial and technical conferences revised the projected production capacities of different industries and increased their outputs.

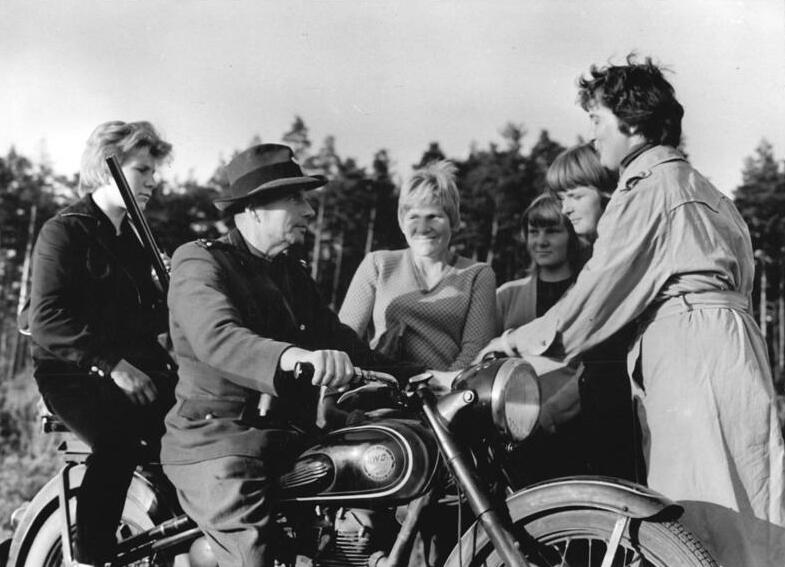
Near Neustrelitz, East Germany, September 1959, a forester (on motorcycle) congratulates a team of women for achieving 184% of a production goal during their shift—by planting 25,000 saplings against a quota of only 16,000.

Female Stakhanovites emerged less frequently than male, but a quarter of all trade-union women were designated as "norm-breaking". Women working as milkmaids, calf tenders, and fieldworkers represented the preponderance of rural Stakhanovites.

Soviet authorities claimed that the Stakhanovite movement caused significant increases in labor productivity. It was reported that during the first five-year plan (1928–32) industrial labor productivity increased by 41%. During the second five-year plan (1933–1937) it reportedly increased by 82%. Discussions of the draft constitution in the 1930s were used to encourage a second wind for the movement.

During World War II, the Stakhanovites deployed different methods to increase productivity, such as working several machine-tools at a time and by combining professions. The Stakhanovites organized the two-hundreders movement (двухсотники, or dvukhsotniki; 200% or more of quota in a single shift).

== Opposition and termination ==
Not all workers were pleased with the pressures created by the Stakhanovites and the bureaucratic demands for increased productivity. Some groups held Stakhanov responsible for making their lives harder and threatened him for it. Opponents of the movement risked invoking the label of "wrecker" being charged against them by Soviet authorities.

In 1988, the Soviet newspaper Komsomolskaya Pravda stated that the widely propagandized personal achievements of Stakhanov actually were puffery. The paper insisted that Stakhanov had used a number of helpers on support work, while the output was tallied for him alone. According to the Soviet state media, the Stakhanov movement had eventually led to increased productivity by means of a better organization of workflow processes, including more specialization and better task sequencing.

== In fiction ==
- Yuri Krymov's 1938 novel Tanker "Derbent", and the 1941 feature film based on it, are about Stakhanovitism in oil transport across the Caspian Sea.
- Andrzej Wajda's film Man of Marble explores the myth-making process behind a fictional Polish Stakhanovite, telling the story of his rise and eventual fall from grace.
- George Orwell's novel Animal Farm has a representation of the Stakhanovites in the character of Boxer the Horse, whose motto is "I will work harder!"
- Harry Turtledove's novel Fallout, from the Hot War trilogy, includes a character in eastern Russia who gets into trouble with local townspeople because he works hard like a Stakhanovite.
- Grigori Aleksandrov's film Tanya centered on a female character who becomes a member of the Stakhanovite movement.

== See also ==
- 996 working hour system
- Model worker
- Cherkasova movement
- Chollima movement
- Family in the Soviet Union
- Gaganova movement
- Izotovite movement
- Learn from Dazhai in agriculture
- Lunin movement
- Shturmovshchina
- Udarnik
- Vinogradova movement

== Works cited ==
- Krivonoss, P. (1939). The Stakhanov Movement on Soviet Railroads. Foreign Languages Publishing House.
- Overy, Richard (2004). The Dictators: Hitler's Germany, Stalin's Russia. New York: W.W. Norton. ISBN 0-393-02030-4.
- Service, Robert (2005). A History of Modern Russia, from Nicholas II to Putin. Cambridge, MA: Harvard University Press. ISBN 0-674-01801-X.
- Siegelbaum, Lewis H. (1990) [1988]. Stakhanovism and the Politics of Productivity in the USSR, 1935–1941. Cambridge University Press. ISBN 978-0-52139556-4.
- Siegelbaum, Lewis; Sokolov, Andrei (2000). Stalinism as a Way of Life. New Haven, CT: Yale University Press. ISBN 0-300-08480-3.
- Stalin, J. V. (17 November 1935). Speech at the First All-Union Conference of Stakhanovites (Speech). London: Red Star Press Ltd. (published 1978) – via Marxists Internet Archive.
- VOKS (1937). "The System of Training in the USSR". Slavonic and East European Review. 15 (45): 623–628. JSTOR 4203280.
- Williamson, David G. (2013). Age of the Dictators: a Study of the European Dictatorships, 1918–53. White Plains: Taylor & Francis. ISBN 978-1-31787014-2. OCLC 956644191.
