= Peter principle (disambiguation) =

The Peter principle is a concept in management theory that people in a hierarchy rise to their level of incompetence.

Peter principle or The Peter Principle may also refer to:

- The Peter Principle (TV series), a British television series
- Software Peter principle, a concept in software engineering in which a project becomes too complex to be understood even by its creators
- Peter Principle (1954–2017), American bass player for Tuxedomoon

== See also ==
- "With great power comes great responsibility", also known as the Peter Parker principle
