= Fluid UI =

FluidUI - Mobile Mockups
- Developer: Fluid Software
- Type: Software Prototyping
- License: Free & Paid Subscriptions
- Website: www.fluidui.com

Fluid UI is a browser-based wireframing and prototyping tool developed by Fluid Software and used to design mobile touch interfaces.

== History ==
Fluid Software is an Irish software development company founded in August 2010 by Dave Kearney and Ian Hannigan. The company began work on its first product Fluid UI in January 2011 and entered private beta on December of the same year. The beta saw over 3000 users trialling the software. Fluid UI was launched on the 4th of July 2012.

== Overview ==
Fluid UI is an HTML5 mobile interface prototyping tool that helps the user interface designer to rapidly create prototypes by arranging pre-built widgets into a drag-and-drop WYSIWYG editor during the requirements stage of app development. It enables iteration and collaboration between user and client. Platforms supported include Android, Android Tablet, iPhone and iPad.

== See also ==
- Rapid Application Development
- Prototyping
- Website wireframe
- Rapid prototyping
- Software Prototyping
- Mock-up
- Human–computer interaction
