= Software as a Product =

Software sold as a one-time purchase

Software as a product (SaaP) is software that is sold to users as a one-time purchase and single download to be installed and used on a personal device or on an on-premise company server. The main advantages of this delivery model is that the user has a higher level of governance, offline functionality, improved security, and a one-time payment. However, this model is also burdened by higher upfront costs and a manual management process for updating and scaling which can be costly and cause disruptions in workflows. This is in contrast to SaaS, where users buy a subscription and where the software is centrally hosted.

One example of software as a product has historically been Microsoft Office, which has traditionally been distributed as a file package using CD-ROM or other physical media or is downloaded over network. Office 365, on the other hand, is an example of SaaS, where a monthly subscription is required.

== Development effort estimation ==
In the book The Mythical Man-Month Fred Brooks tells that when estimating project times, it should be remembered that programming products (which can be sold to paying customers) are three times as hard to write as simple independent in-house programs, because requirement to work on different situations, which increases testing efforts and as a documentation.

== See also ==
- The Mythical Man-Month
- Minimum viable product
- Product manager
- Software as a service

== Literature ==
- Brooks, Fred P. (1995). The Mythical Man Month (Anniversary ed.). Addison-Wesley. ISBN 0-201-83595-9.
