= Gold plating (project management) =

Poor practice in project management

In project management and time management, gold plating is the phenomenon of working on a project or task past the point of diminishing returns.

For example, after having met a project's requirements, the manager or the developer works on further enhancing the product, thinking that the customer will be delighted to see additional or more polished features, beyond that which was asked for or expected. If the customer is disappointed in the results, the extra effort put into it might be futile.

Gold plating is considered a bad project management practice for different project management best practices and methodologies such as Project Management Body of Knowledge (PMBOK) and PRINCE2. In this case, 'gold plating' means the addition of any feature not considered in the original scope plan (PMBOK) or product description (PRINCE2) at any point of the project. This is because it introduces a new source of risks to the original planning such as additional testing, documentation, costs, or timelines. However, avoiding gold plating does not prevent new features from being added to the project; they can be added at any time as long as they follow the official change procedure and the impact of the change in all the areas of the project is taken into consideration.

== Effects of gold plating ==
Even the best results of gold plating can lead to negative consequences for a project manager or the project as a whole. In a best-case scenario, the customer accepts the project deliverable with the out-of-scope work, and customer expectations on future projects may forever be elevated to unrealistic levels. In a worst-case scenario, the customer might reject the project deliverable entirely and nullify the contract.

== See also ==
- Second-system effect
- Scope creep
- Worse is better
- Death march (project management)
- KISS principle
- You aren't gonna need it (YAGNI)
