= Software Peter principle =

Engineering term for a complex, failing project

The Software Peter principle is used in software engineering to describe a dying project which has become too complex to be understood even by its own developers.

It is well known in the industry as a silent killer of projects, but by the time the symptoms arise it is often too late to do anything about it. Good managers can avoid this disaster by establishing clear coding practices where unnecessarily complicated code and design is avoided.

The name is used in the book C++ FAQs (see below), and is derived from the Peter principle – a theory about incompetence in hierarchical organizations.

== Causes ==
=== Loss of conceptual integrity ===
The conceptual integrity of software is a measure of how well it conforms to a single, simple set of design principles, according to The Mythical Man Month. When done properly, it provides the most functionality using the simplest idioms. It makes software easier to use by making it simple to create and learn.

Conceptual integrity is achieved when the software’s design proceeds from a small number of agreeing individuals. For software to maintain conceptual integrity, the design must be controlled by a single, small group of people who understand the code (including the nature of how all the subroutines and variables interact) in depth.

In projects without a strong software architecture team, the task of design is often combined with the task of implementation and is implicitly delegated among the individual software developers. Under these circumstances, developers are less likely to sacrifice personal interests in favor of the interests of the product. The complexity of the product grows as a result of developers adding new designs and altering earlier ones to reflect changes in fashion and individual taste.

=== Programmer incompetence ===
Good software developers understand the importance of communicating with people over communicating with the computer, according to Code Complete. Studies showed that programmers spends more than 50% of their time communicating with people, while the actual programming may only take up as little as 15% to 10%, depending on the level of seniority.

Maintenance programmers spend 50 to 60 percent of their time trying to understand the code they have to maintain and a software program will have, on average, 10 generations of maintenance programmers in its lifetime.

=== Programmer inexperience ===
Programmers sometimes make implementation choices that work but have unintended negative consequences. The most common of these mistakes are cataloged and referred to as smells in the book Refactoring. Over time, many such implementation choices degrade the software’s design, making it increasingly difficult to understand.

== See also ==
- Anti-pattern – Common response to a recurring problem that is usually ineffective or counterproductives
- Death march (project management) – Project management term
- Greenspun's tenth rule – Computing aphorism
- Project management – Practice of leading the work of a team to achieve goals and criteria at a specified time
- Software development process – Process by which software is developed
- Obfuscation (software) – Deliberate creation of difficult-to-understand code

== Literature ==
- Brooks, Frederick P. (2013). The mythical man-month: essays on software engineering (Anniversary with 4 new chapters, 39. printing ed.). Boston, Mass.: Addison-Wesley. ISBN 9780201835953.
- Cline, Marshall P.; Lomow, Greg A.; Girou, Mike (2010). C++ FAQs (2nd ed.). Reading, Mass.: Addison-Wesley. ISBN 978-0-201-30983-6.
- Fowler, Martin; Beck, Kent (2013). Refactoring: improving the design of existing code (28. printing ed.). Boston: Addison-Wesley. ISBN 978-0201485677.
- Grams, Chris (2019-10-15). "How Much Time Do Developers Spend Actually Writing Code?". The New Stack.
- McConnell, Steve (2004). Code complete (2nd ed.). Redmond, Washington: Microsoft Press. ISBN 0735619670.
- Rodenas, David (2022-10-21). "Developers Spend Less Than 10% of Time Coding". Medium.
- Sullivan, S. L. (1988). "How much time do software professionals spend communicating?". ACM SIGCPR Computer Personnel. 11 (4): 2–5. doi:10.1145/54127.54128. ISSN 0160-2497.
- "Software developers: how much time do you actually spend actually writing code compared with other tasks at work?". The Workplace Stack Exchange. 2022-03-21.
