= Izotov =

Izotov (masculine, Russian: Изотов) or Izotova (feminine, Russian: Изотова) is a Russian surname. Notable people with the surname include:

- Danila Izotov (born 1991), Russian swimmer
- Dmitry Izotov (born 1984), Russian soccer player
- Eduard Izotov (1936–2003), Soviet actor
- Eugene Izotov (born 1973), Russian oboist
- Nikita Izotov (1902–1951), Soviet mine worker
- Sergei Izotov (1917–1983), Soviet aircraft engine designer
