= Aviarabochiy =

Aviarabochiy (Russian: Авиарабочий, 'Aviation Worker') was a newspaper published from Moscow, Soviet Union between 1935 and 1938. It was the organ of the Central Committee of the Union of Aviation Industry Workers. The first issue was published on 11 June 1935, and the last issue on 30 January 1938. It was published twice monthly, and dedicated extensive coverage to the Stakhanovite movement within the aircraft industry. L. A. Schindler was the editor of Aviarabochiy.
