= Cruft =

Jargon word for redundant, obtrusive material, originally used in computing

Cruft is a jargon word for anything that is left over, redundant, and getting in the way. It is used particularly for defective, superseded, useless, superfluous, or dysfunctional elements in computer software.

== History ==
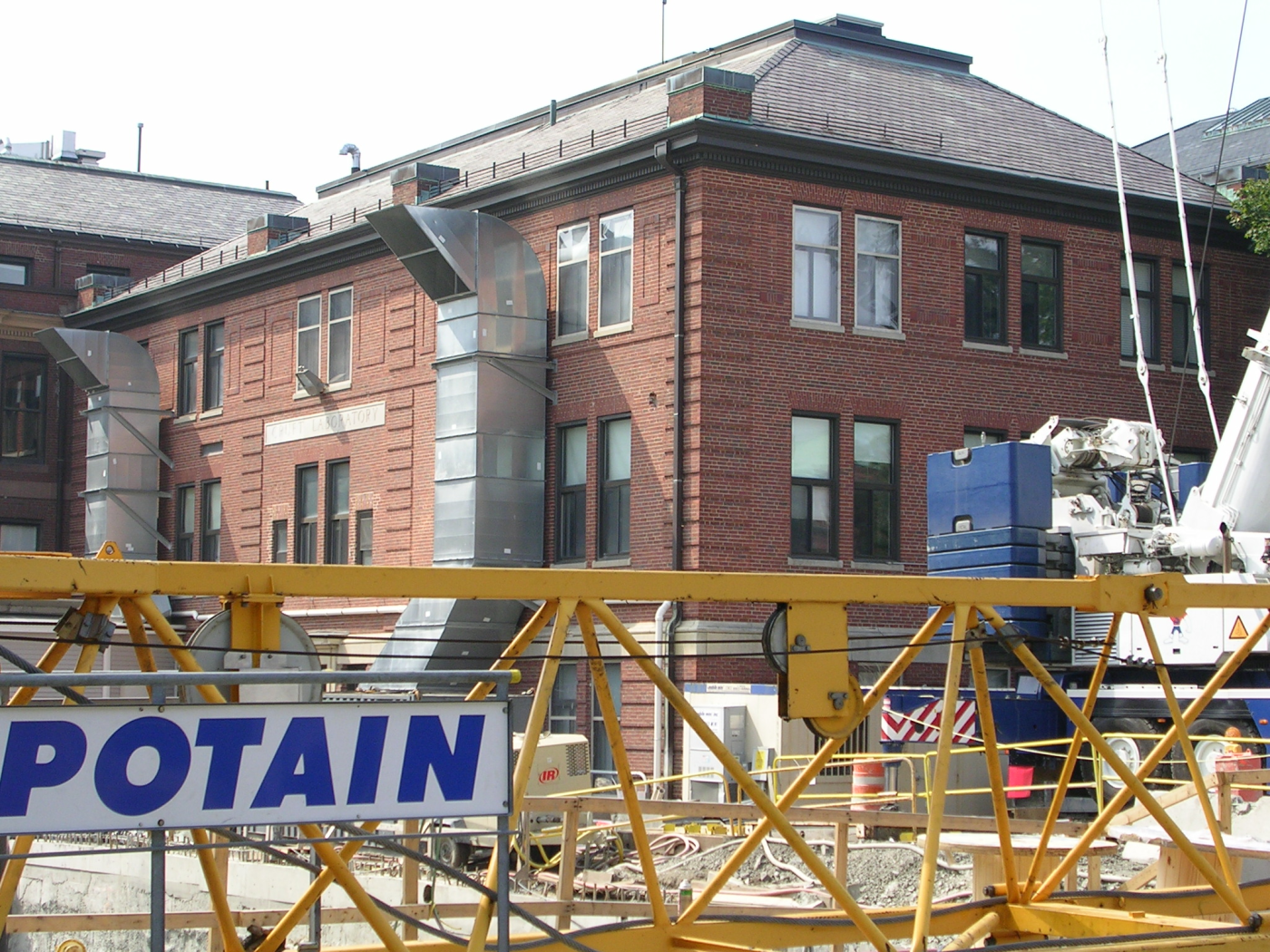
The name of Harvard Cruft Laboratory is one possible origin of the term

Around 1958, the term was used in the sense of "garbage" by students frequenting the Tech Model Railroad Club (TMRC) at the Massachusetts Institute of Technology (MIT). In the 1959 edition of the club's dictionary, it was defined as "that which magically amounds in the Clubroom just before you walk in to clean up. In other words, rubbage". Its author Peter Samson later explained that this was meant in the sense of "detritus, that which needs to be swept up and thrown out", adding, "The dictionary has no definition for 'crufty', a word I didn't hear until some years later." In 2008 it was also used to refer to alumni who remain socially active at MIT.

The origin of the term is uncertain, but it may be derived from Harvard University's Cruft Laboratory. Built in 1915 as a gift from a donor named Harriet Otis Cruft, it housed the Harvard Physics Department's radar lab during World War II.

== Software ==
The FreeBSD handbook uses the term to refer to leftover or superseded object code that accumulates in a folder or directory when software is recompiled and new executables and data files are produced. Such cruft, if required for the new executables to work properly, can cause the BSD equivalent of dependency hell. The word is also used to describe instances of unnecessary, leftover or just poorly written source code in a computer program that is then uselessly, or even harmfully, compiled into object code.

Cruft accumulation may result in technical debt, which can subsequently make adding new features or modifying existing features—even to improve performance—more difficult and time-consuming.

In the context of Internet or Web addresses (Uniform Resource Locators or "URLs"), cruft refers to the characters that are relevant or meaningful only to the people who created the site, such as implementation details of the computer system which serves the page. Examples of URL cruft could include filename extensions such as .php or .html, and internal organizational details such as /public/ or /Users/john/work/drafts/.

== Computer hardware ==
Cruft may also refer to unused and out-of-date computer paraphernalia, collected through upgrading, inheritance, or simple acquisition, both deliberate and through circumstance. This accumulated hardware, however, often has benefit when IT systems administrators, technicians, and the like have need for critical replacement parts. An unused machine or component similar to a production unit could allow near-immediate restoration of the failed unit, as opposed to waiting for a shipped replacement.

== See also ==
- AI slop – Low-quality AI-generated digital content
- Software bloat
- Dead-code elimination, the automatic removal of unnecessary code by compilers
- Duplicate code
- Feature creep
- Muda (Japanese term)
- Spaghetti code
- Non-coding DNA
- Vestigiality
