= The Design of Design =

2010 book by Fred Brooks

The Design of Design: Essays from a Computer Scientist
- Author: Fred Brooks
- Language: English
- Subject: Design
- Publisher: Addison-Wesley
- Publication date: 2010
- Pages: 448
- ISBN: 978-0201362985

The Design of Design: Essays from a Computer Scientist is a book by Fred Brooks, about design experiences, case studies, methods, and philosophies.
