= Andy and Bill's law =

Maxim stating that software growth will offset faster computers

Andy and Bill's law, occasionally known as The Great Moore's Law Compensator and, in a slightly different sense, Wirth's law, is the assertion that new software will tend to consume any increase in computing power that new hardware can provide. The law originates from a humorous one-liner told in the 1990s during computing conferences: "what Andy giveth, Bill taketh away."

== Metonym ==
The personalized version of the phrase is a riff upon the business strategies of former Intel CEO Andy Grove and former Microsoft CEO Bill Gates. Intel and Microsoft had entered into a lucrative partnership in the 1980s through to the 1990s, and Intel chipsets became the de facto standard for PCs running Microsoft Windows, giving way to the term "Wintel".

Despite this profitable arrangement, Grove felt that Gates was not making full use of the powerful capabilities of Intel chips and that Gates was in fact refusing to upgrade his software to achieve optimum hardware performance and allowing consumers to maximize what their PCs could do. Grove's frustration with the dominance of Microsoft software--claiming that Bill Gates did not "share the same sense of urgency to come up with an improved consumer PC"--over Intel hardware became public, spawning the humorous catchphrase, and later, the law.

== Measurements ==
These gains, or lack thereof, were codified by Randall Kennedy in InfoWorld in 2008 stating "Despite the gains in computational performance during this time period according to Moore's law, Office 2007 performed the same task at half the speed on a prototypical year 2007 computer as compared to Office 2000 on a year 2000 computer". Kennedy performed comparisons using a cross-version test script called OfficeBench and concluded that Microsoft Office 2007, used on Windows Vista used more than 12 times as much memory and nearly three times as much processing power as the Office 2000 which was the standard for PCs seven years earlier.

In later years, the law has also been stated "what Intel giveth, Microsoft taketh away," foregoing the metonymy of the original.

== See also ==
- Jevons paradox
- Moore's law
- Parkinson's Law
- Wirth's law
- List of eponymous laws
