= Shturmovshchina =

Dysfunctional, last-minute rush to meet work quotas in Soviet institutions

Shturmovshchina (Russian: штурмовщина, romanized: [ʂtʊrmɐfˈɕːinə]), last-minute rush, lit., storming) was a common Soviet work practice of frantic and overtime work at the end of a planning period in order to fulfill the planned production target. The practice usually gave rise to products of poor quality at the end of a planning cycle.

The cycle of shturmovshchina, associated with the tradition of monthly targets (on which bonuses and managers' positions depend), is described as follows. Due to the planned economy, required materials and tools were not always available on time, and the work slowed as a result, or workers might have been reassigned to do something else, with the expectation that the job would be done when the materials arrive. However, when the end of a month neared, management was placed under pressure, substitute materials and improvised tools were used, and the workers were expected to produce the expected product in time. All this abruptly ended at the end of the month. At the beginning of the next month, the workers slacken to recover from the previous storm, thereby continuing the next cycle.

The process is known to consist of three stages:

- Spiachka ('hibernation", Russian: спячка) – this was the first third of the planned period. Workers are not very efficient, mostly because there are no orders to do anything;
- Raskachka ("buildup", Russian: раскачка) – at this stage it is more or less known what should be done, but there is too much time ahead, and during that time the requirements may change, as well as the management;
- Goriachka ("fever", Russian: горячка) – this is the last stage of the planned period; by the end of this stage the product is supposed to be ready, or the management may be reprimanded; workers work overtime.

== See also ==
- Charrette – Intense period of design or planning activity
- Death march (project management) – Project management term
- Project management – Practice of leading the work of a team to achieve goals and criteria at a specified time
- Scrum (software development) – Management framework
- Socialist emulation – Form of competition practised in the Soviet Union
- Stakhanovite movement – Soviet work ethos equating labor with heroism
- State quality mark of the USSR – Certification mark
- Udarnik – Soviet term for an exceptionally high productivity worker
- Crunch (video games) – Overwork in the video game industry
