= Nikita Izotov =

Soviet coal miner (1902–1951)

Nikita (Nikifor) Alekseyevich Izotov (Russian: Никита (Никифор) Алексеевич Изотов; 9 February [O.S. 27 January] 1902 — January 14, 1951) was a Soviet coal miner. He is sometimes referred to (at least by specialists) as the "First Stakhanovite", because he was the first Soviet worker singled out by the press for a superhuman act of labor. In his case, he was praised for having mined far more coal than anyone else—dozens of times the quota.

For a brief period of time, beginning with a May 11, 1932, article in Pravda, Izotov was held up as a model worker, giving rise to the short-lived movement of "Izotovism", which was later eclipsed by Stakhanovism. This movement later ended during the de-Stalinization era.

== See also ==
- Izotovite movement
