= Socialist emulation =

Form of competition practised in the Soviet Union

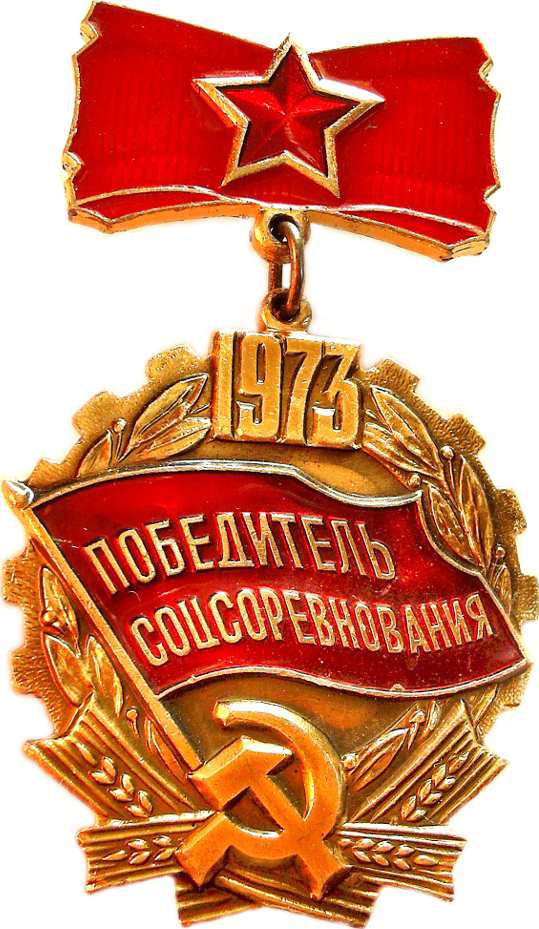
"1973 socialist competition winner" award.

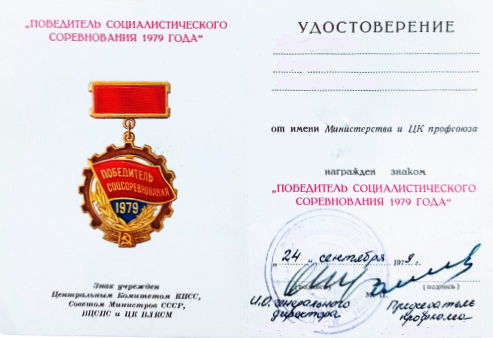
1979 certificate of the "socialist competition winner".

Socialist competition or socialist emulation (Russian: социалистическое соревнование, romanized: sotsialisticheskoye sorevnovaniye, or соцсоревнование, sotssorevnovaniye) was a form of competition between state enterprises and between individuals practiced in the Soviet Union and in other Eastern bloc states.

== Competition vs. emulation ==
The first variant is a literal translation of the Russian term, commonly used by Western authors. The second form is an official Soviet translation of the term, intended to put distance from the "capitalist competition", which in its turn was translated as капиталистическая конкуренция, "kapitalisticheskaya konkurenciya". Implied was that "capitalist competition" only profited those that won, while "socialist emulation" benefited all involved.

The race between teams and team members for overperforming the five-year plans led to increasingly unrealistic targets, which could only be satisfied with cheating, double accounting, hoarding of resources, and shturmovshchina (last-minute cramming)—which, in the long term, led to a collapse of the supply chain in the economy. In 1987, Soviet economist Nikolai Shmelov estimated that out of 450 billion roubles worth of inventories of raw materials and parts, around 170 billion was kept as surplus, with the sole purpose of securing the successful completion of plans.

== Organization ==
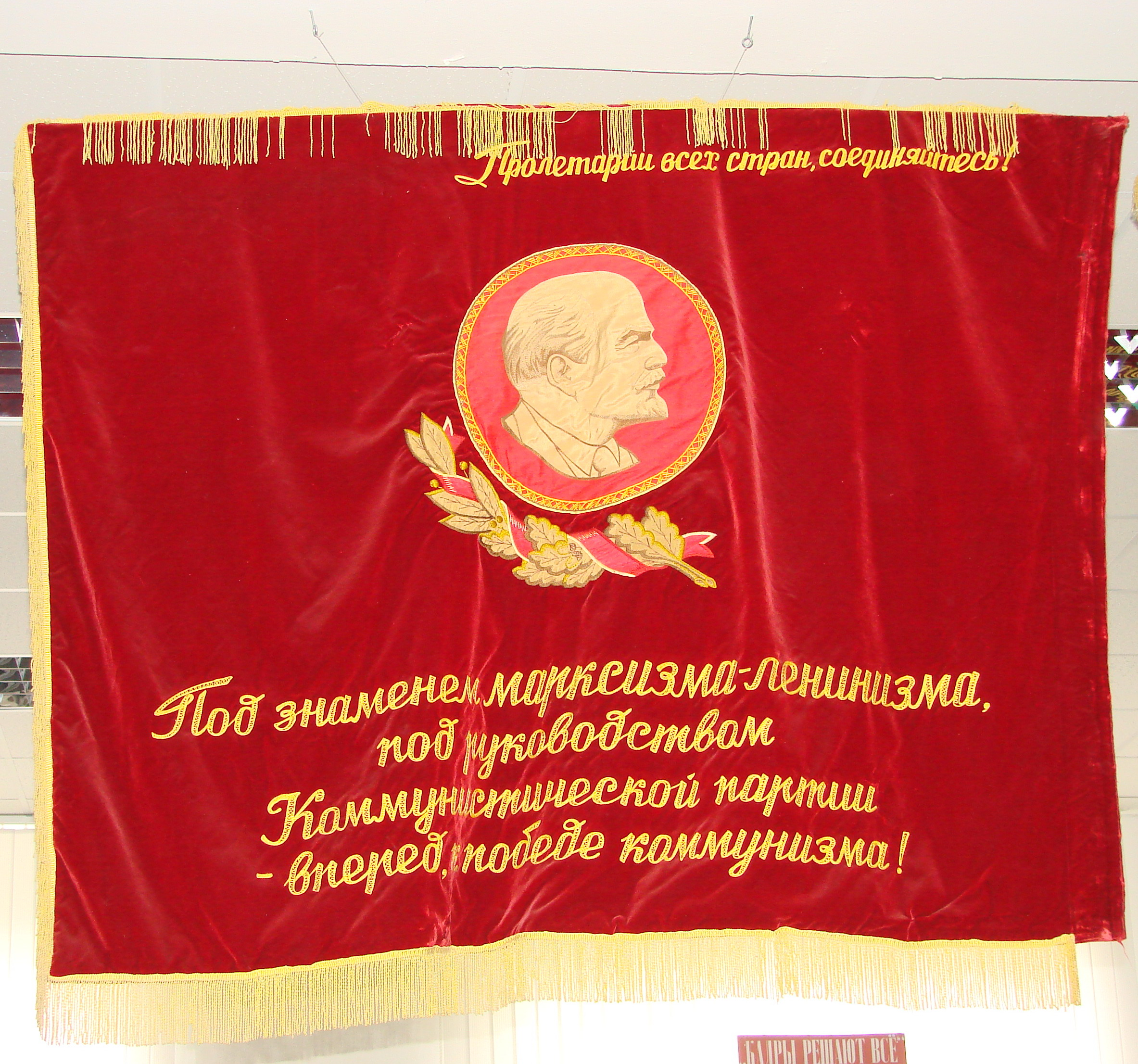
Socialist competition winner flag

Socialist emulation was nominally voluntary everywhere where people worked or served: in industry, in agriculture, in offices, institutions, schools, hospitals, army, etc. With the natural exception of the armed forces, committees of the trade unions were in charge of managing the socialist emulation.

An important component of socialist emulation was "socialist self-obligations" (социалистические обязательства). Whilst the production plan was the major benchmark, employees and work collectives were supposed to put forth "socialist self-obligations" and even "enhanced socialist self-obligations" (повышенные соцобязательства) beyond the plan, both either as a collective or individually.

Deadlines for tallying up the results of a socialist emulation were usually set at major socialist and communist holidays or notable dates, like the birthday of Vladimir Lenin or the anniversary of the October Revolution.

Winners were awarded both materially and morally. Material awards were money, goods, or perks specific to socialist systems, such as tickets to resorts, authorizations for a trip abroad, right to obtain a dwelling, or a car outside the main queue, etc. Moral awards were honorary diplomas, honorary badges, and/or putting winners' portraits on the "Board of Honor" (Доска Почета); work collectives were awarded with the "Transferable Red Banner of the Socialist Emulation Winner" (Переходящее знамя победителя в социалистическом соревновании). More prestigious was the nomination to state orders and medals for services rendered by individuals and by state enterprises.

== History ==
Vladimir Lenin was the originator and promoter of the idea of socialist emulation as a means for organising "the majority of working people into a field of labour in which they can display their abilities, develop the capacities, and reveal those talents". His milestone article was "How to organize the emulation?" ("Как организовать соревнование?"), in which among the important goal of the emulation was discovery of persons with organizational and management skills, to replace tsarist-era specialists. Also, he was the first to set "socialist emulation" against "capitalist competition". Lenin's article however repeatedly highlights the need for strictest "accounting and control" (учёт и контроль) at all levels for the socialist society, postulating mutual "accounting and control" between all layers of the government and supply chain.

Later, Joseph Stalin wrote in his streamlined style:

Principles of (capitalist) competition: defeat and death of ones and victory and dominance of the others.
Principles of socialist emulation: friendly assistance to lagging ones by the leading ones in order to achieve a common rise. ...etc.

While criteria of socialist emulation were easy to set, understand, and quantify in production areas, it was not so in non-production areas: medicine, education, work of clerks, etc., where significant formalism took place and among the criteria a significant weight was attributed to "social activism", not related to the work done. Social activism, among other actions, meant:

- Participating in all CPSU and Komsomol activities
- Recruitment of future CPSU members in their workplaces or hometowns
- Election campaigns for deputies for the Union and Republican Supreme Soviets and Soviets of People's Deputies
- Active work during national holidays

Attempt to add a "moral" aspect to daily work was a common feature among 20th century socialist governments, with Arbeitskult ("work cult") in Germany, which "stressed the patriotic potential of labour, comparing industrial work with the task of a soldier defending the Fatherland" and Yan’an heroes in Maoist China.

== See also ==
- Gamification
