= Cherkasova movement =

Patriotic movement of volunteer brigades during and after the Great Patriotic War

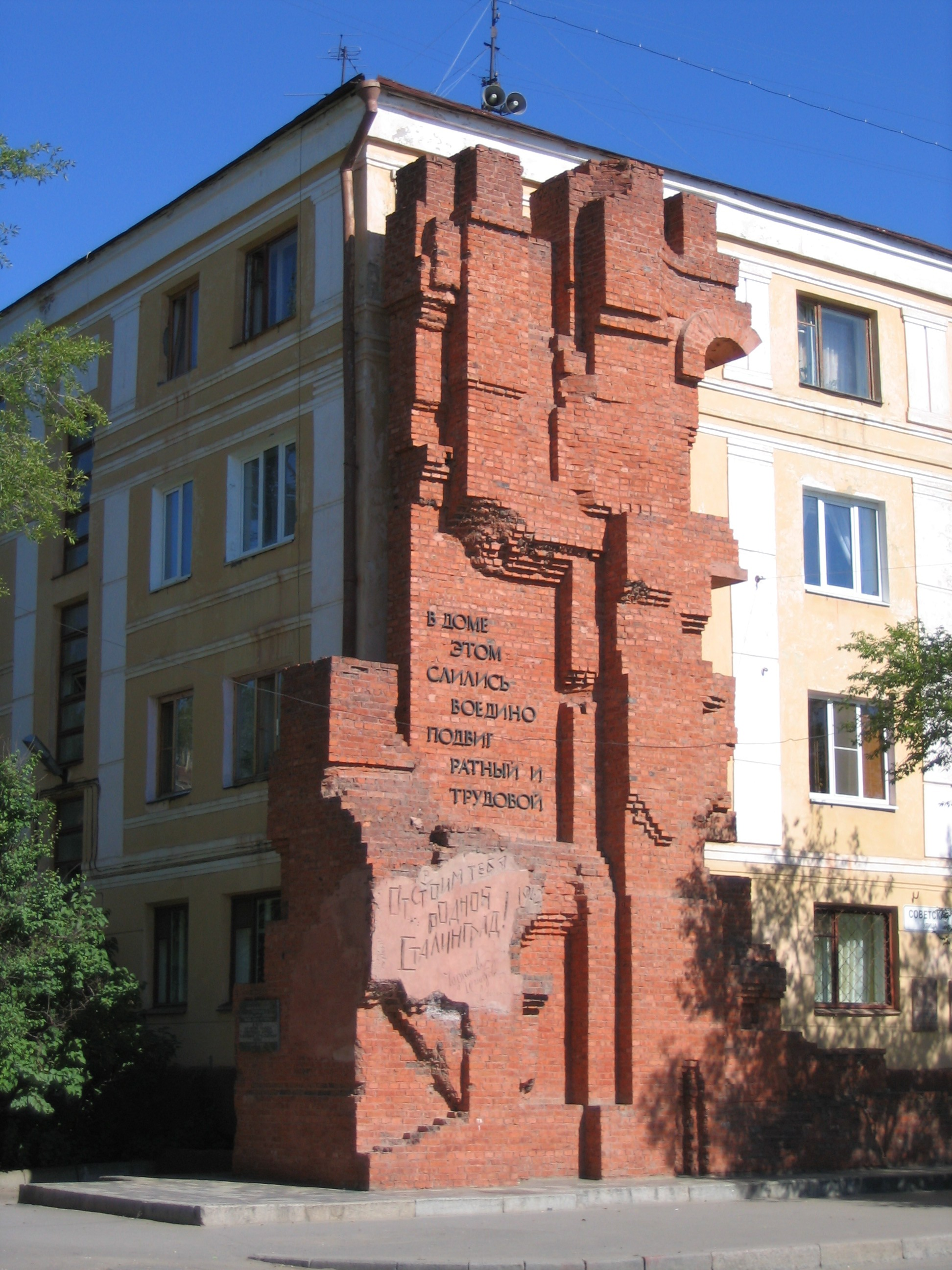
Memorial to the Cherkasova movement at Pavlov's House

The Cherkasova movement (Russian: Черкасовское движение) was a movement of volunteer brigades that worked on restoration work in the Soviet Union during and after World War II.

== History ==
The restoration movement, initiated by the kindergarten worker Aleksandra Maksimovna Cherkasova, originated in Stalingrad in June 1943. It was mainly women who participated in it. Pavlov's House was the very first to be restored. A few days after the initiative of A.M. Cherkasova, the newspaper Stalingradskaya Pravda published an appeal of her brigade to all the workers of the city, which was supported by the city party organization. By the end of 1943, more than 820 Cherkasova brigades were working in Stalingrad, in 1944 — 1192 brigades, in 1945 — 1227 brigades.

In 1944–1945, the second stage of the Cherkasova movement began. Women of Stalingrad after the end of the working day began to master historically male professions such as bricklayer and carpenter. During 1944, about 3,000 housewives, workers and employees mastered construction specialties.

The period from 1945 to the end of the 1950s is the time of the third stage of the Cherkasova movement. Labor brigades in the city began to be assigned to specific construction sites. People did not work at all for restoration, but specifically at one of the facilities. These objects were: Central Embankment, Pedagogical Institute, drama theater, musical comedy theater, Mamayev Kurgan, and the river port.

== Spread and extent ==
In 1943–1944, the Cherkasova movement became widespread in areas liberated from the Nazi occupiers or affected by enemy air raids. In 1944, residents of Leningrad worked 27.1 million hours outside of working hours and performed 26 million rubles worth of work on the restoration of the municipal economy. At the beginning of 1944, the Cherkasova movement unfolded in the Byelorussian SSR, in which, 735 Cherkasova brigades were working by the end of 1944. In the Latvian SSR, 470 brigades were employed only on the restoration of railway transport. The Cherkasova movement played an important role in accelerating the pace of recovery of the national economy in the post-war years.
