= Lightweight protocol =

A lightweight protocol in computer networking is a communication protocol that is characterized by a relatively small overhead (caused e.g. by bulky metadata) in transmitted on top of the functional data:

- Lightweight Directory Access Protocol
- Lightweight Extensible Authentication Protocol
- Lightweight Presentation Protocol
- Internet Content Adaptation Protocol
- Skinny Client Control Protocol
- OpenLDAP
