= Code bloat =

Production of unnecessarily long, slow or wasteful program code

In computer programming, code bloat is the production of executable code (source code or machine code) that is unnecessarily long, slow, or otherwise wasteful of resources. Code bloat can be caused by inadequacies in the programming language in which the code is written, the compiler used to compile it, or the programmer writing it. Thus, while code bloat generally refers to source code size (as produced by the programmer), it can be used to refer instead to the generated code size or even the binary file size.

== Examples ==
The following algorithm is written in JavaScript, and can generate an HTML <img> tag based on user input. It contains a large number of redundant code: unnecessary logic and variables, and inefficient string concatenation.

// Complex
function TK2getImageHTML(size, zoom, sensor, markers) {
    const strHTMLStart = '<img src="';
    const strHTMLEnd = '" alt="The map"/>';
    var strFinalImage = "";
    var strURL = "https://example.com/staticmap?center=";
    var strSize = '&size='+ size;
    var strZoom = '&zoom='+ zoom;
    var strSensor = '&sensor='+ sensor;    
   
    strURL += markers[0].latitude;
    strURL += ",";
    strURL += markers[0].longitude;
    strURL += strSize;
    strURL += strZoom;
    strURL += strSensor;
    
    for (var i = 0; i < markers.length; i++) {
        strURL += markers[i].addMarker();
    }
    
    strFinalImage = strHTMLStart + strURL + strHTMLEnd;
    return strFinalImage;
}

The same algorithm above can be rewritten to be less redundant and more efficient as follows (although not as readable):

// Simplified
function TK2getImageHTML(sz, zm, sens, mks){
    let url=""
    mks.forEach(mk => url += mk.addMarker())
    return `<img src="https://example.com/staticmap?center=${mks[0].latitude},${mks[0].longitude}&size=${sz}&zoom=${zm}&sensor=${sens}${url}" alt="The map">`
}

== Code density of different languages ==
The implementation of generic programming mechanisms significantly influences the resulting binary size. Programming languages like C++ use a "stenciling" or monomorphization approach for templates, where the compiler generates a separate copy of the code for each distinct data type used. While this eliminates runtime overhead and allows for specific optimizations, it frequently leads to code bloat when many different types are instantiated. Conversely, languages like Java typically use type erasure, sharing a single copy of the compiled code for all data types by treating them as generic objects (e.g., via boxing). This approach minimizes code size but can introduce runtime performance overhead due to the need for dynamic dispatch or unboxing.

The difference in code density between various computer languages is so great that often less memory is needed to hold both a program written in a "compact" language (such as a domain-specific programming language, Microsoft P-Code, or threaded code), plus an interpreter for that compact language (written in native code), than to hold that program written directly in native code.

== Reducing bloat ==
Some techniques for reducing code bloat include:

- Code refactoring a commonly used code sequence into a subroutine, and calling that subroutine from several locations, rather than copy and pasting the code at each of those locations (copy-and-paste programming).
- Re-using subroutines that have already been written (perhaps with additional parameters), rather than re-writing them again from scratch as a new routine.
- Combining program analysis to detect bloated code, with program transformation to remove bloated code.
- Disabling/removing certain program optimizations, as they may actually hurt performance.
- Using code minifiers/obfuscators that strip unneeded whitespace/indentation and other things unimportant to a program running.

=== Compiler optimizations ===
Compilers employ various techniques to mitigate bloat, such as Dead code elimination (DCE), which detects and removes instructions that do not affect the program's output. However, the goal of reducing code size often conflicts with execution speed. Optimization strategies like Loop unrolling and function inlining can significantly improve runtime performance but inevitably increase the size of the binary by duplicating instruction sequences.

=== Dependency management ===
In modern software ecosystems that rely heavily on third-party package managers (such as Maven or npm), "dependency bloat" has become a prevalent issue. This occurs when applications include entire libraries but only use a small fraction of their functionality. Empirical studies have shown that automated "debloating" techniques—which analyze the call graph of an application to remove unused bytecode or classes from the final build—can significantly reduce the size of software packages without altering their behavior. Relying heavily on dependencies can also have other issues besides bloat, as demonstrated by the NPM left-pad incident.

== See also ==
- Dead code elimination
- Minimalism (computing)
- Muntzing
- Polymorphism (computer science)
- Software optimization
- Software bloat
- Lightweight software
