= Feature creep =

Excessive ongoing expansion or addition of features in a product

Feature creep is the excessive ongoing expansion or addition of new features in a product, especially in computer software, video games (where it should not be confused with power creep) and consumer and business electronics. These extra features go beyond the basic function of the product and can result in software bloat and over-complication, rather than simple design.

The definition of what qualifies as "feature creep" varies among end users, where what is perceived as such by some users may be considered practical functionality by others. Feature creep is considered the most common sources of cost and schedule overruns. It thus endangers and can even kill products and projects.

== Causes ==
Feature creep may arise from the desire to provide the consumer with a more useful or desirable product in order to increase sales or distribution. Once a product does everything that it is designed to do, the manufacturer may add functions some users might consider unneeded (sometimes at the cost of efficiency) or continue with the original version (at the cost of a perceived lack of improvement).

Feature creep may also arise as a result of compromise from a committee implementing several different viewpoints or use cases in the same product, even for opportunistic reasons. As more features are added to support each approach, cross-conversion features between the multiple paradigms may further complicate the total features.

== Control ==
There are several methods to control feature creep, including: strict limits for allowable features, multiple variations, and pruning excess features.

=== Separation ===
Later feature creep may be avoided by basing initial design on strong software fundamentals, such as logical separation of functionality and data access, e.g. using submenus that are optionally accessible by power users who desire more functionality and a higher verbosity of information. It can be actively controlled with rigorous change management and by delaying changes to later delivery phases of a project.

Because the ever-growing, ever-expanding addition of new features might exceed available resources, a minimal core "basic" version of a product can be maintained separately, to ensure operation in smaller operating environments. Using the "80/20 rule", the more basic product variations might fulfill the needs of the majority (e.g. ~80%) of the users, so they would not be subjected to the complexity (or extra expense) of features requested by the advanced 20% of users. The extra features are still available, but optional and ready to be utilized for those who solicit them, but they have not been implemented into the basic versions of the products.

=== Variations and options ===
Another method of controlling feature creep is maintaining multiple variations of products, where features are limited and reduced in the more basic variations, e.g. Microsoft Windows editions. For software user interfaces, viewing modes or operation modes can be used (e.g. basic mode or expert mode), between which the users can select to match their own needs.

Both in many graphical user interfaces and command-line interfaces, users are able to opt in for a higher verbosity manually. In the latter case, in many command-line programs, adding a -v or --verbose option manually, does show more detailed information that might be less relevant to minimal users, but useful to power users or for debugging and troubleshooting purposes.

==== Modularity ====
Another solution for feature creep is modularity. Power users who require more functionality can retrofit needed features by downloading software modules, plug-ins, add-ons (also known as add-ins) and custom themes to match their personal requirements.

=== Pruning ===
At some point, the cost of maintaining a particular subset of features might become prohibitive, and pruning can be used. A new product version can omit the extra features, or perhaps a transition period would be used, where old features were deprecated before eventual removal from the system. If there are multiple variations of products, then some of them might be phased out of use. One major example is the Samsung Galaxy S6, released March 2015, of which significantly many software/menu features and also some hardware features were pruned. A “more functional” variation of it hasn't been released.

== Consequences ==
=== Expansion of scope ===
Occasionally, uncontrolled feature creep can lead to products that surpass the scope of what was originally intended; this is known as scope creep. A common consequence of feature creep is the delay or cancellation of a product, which may become more expensive than was originally intended.

=== Delays ===
Often, a reasonably feature-complete software project, or one with moderate amounts of feature creep, can survive and even thrive through many iterations, but its successor release may suffer substantial delays once a decision is taken to rewrite the whole code base in addition to introducing new technologies. For example, Microsoft's Windows Vista was planned to be a minor release between Windows XP and its successor codenamed Windows "Blackcomb" (released as Windows 7), but after adapting more and more features from Blackcomb (many of which were eventually cancelled), Vista turned out to become a major release which took five years of development.

A similar fate was suffered by Netscape 6, which was originally supposed to be Netscape 5. The 1998 decision by Netscape Communications to open-source its Netscape Navigator browser and Communicator Internet suite (both code-named Mozilla) soon made it obvious that the underlying code was too difficult, and required a complete rewrite of Mozilla, which fostered the creation of the Mozilla application framework. This caused significant delays, Netscape 5 was skipped, and the company was purchased by AOL. The subsequent release of Netscape 6.00 in 2000 was widely criticized as alpha-level code, and the project reached stability by Netscape 6.1 in 2001, three years after the decision to rework the Internet suite. By that time, Microsoft's Internet Explorer browser had long-eclipsed Netscape in usage share, which had diminished to single digits.

Even after reaching stability and attaining some necessary new features, the open-source Mozilla Application Suite (then named just Mozilla), on which AOL built Netscape, was viewed as "bloated". Just a year later, a group of Mozilla developers decided to separate the browser component, which eventually became Firefox.

Double Fine Adventures' Kickstarter project Broken Age is another example of a project being delayed by feature creep. Originally supposed to have a release date of October 2012, the first half of the game was released in January 2014 while the second half followed late April 2015, and required two separate funding rounds to complete.

=== Feeping creaturism ===
Feature creep combined with short deadlines will often lead to a "hacky solution". The desired change may be large enough to warrant a redesign of the existing project foundation, but deadline pressure instead requires developers to rush and put out a less-refined product. The spoonerism "feeping creaturism" was coined to emphasize a developer's dislike of this situation, personifying the scope-crept product as "a misshapen creature of hacks ... prowling about in the dark", and the harbinger of more creep to come. ("Feeping" is a jargon synonym of "beeping".)

== See also ==
- Autobesity
- Design document
- Digital hoarding
- Emacs, a text editor that has been extended to do many other tasks
- Enshittification, of which feature creep can be a component
- Greenspun's tenth rule
- KISS principle
- Minimalism in computing
- Mission creep
- Overengineering
- Scope creep
- Second-system effect
- Software bloat
- Plug-in (computing)
- Unix philosophy
- Zawinski's law of software envelopment
