= Estimation (project management) =

Estimation within project management (e.g., for engineering or software development), are the basis of sound project planning. Many processes have been developed to aid project managers in making accurate estimates.

== Processes (engineering) ==
- Analogy based estimation
- Compartmentalization (i.e., breakdown of tasks)
- Cost estimate
- Delphi method
- Documenting estimation results
- Educated assumptions
- Estimating each task
- Examining historical data
- Identifying dependencies
- Parametric estimating
- Risk assessment
- Structured planning

== Processes (software development) ==
Popular estimation processes for software projects include:

- Cocomo
- Cosysmo
- Event chain methodology
- Function points
- Planning poker
- Program Evaluation and Review Technique (PERT)
- Proxy-based estimating (PROBE) (from the Personal Software Process)
- The Planning Game (from Extreme Programming)
- Weighted Micro Function Points (WMFP)
- Wideband Delphi

== See also ==
- Estimation in software engineering
- Software development effort estimation
- Comparison of development estimation software
- Work Breakdown Structure
- Guesstimate
- Ballpark estimate
- Construction Estimating Software
