= Dan Galorath =

American software developer

- Education: California State University
- Occupations: Software developer, businessman, author
- Known for: JPL Softcost, CEI System-3, SEER-SEM

Daniel D. Galorath is an American software developer, businessman and author. Galorath is the president and CEO of Galorath Incorporated and one of the chief developers of the project management software known as SEER-SEM.

He is also the co-author of Software Sizing, Estimation, and Risk Management.

== Education ==
Dan Galorath completed his undergraduate work at California State University, and in 1980, he also received an MBA in management from California State University.

== Career ==
Following college, Galorath worked in software development with a focus on software management. He began working in the aerospace and defense industries. One of his earliest projects was working with Don Reifer on the creation of NASA's Jet Propulsion Laboratory's Softcost program for Robert Tauseworth.

In 1979, Galorath founded Galorath, Inc. as a software development consulting organization.

In 1984, Galorath began consulting for Computer Economics, Inc. It was in that consulting role where Galorath became familiar with Dr. Randall Jensen's modifications to the Putnam model. Because the work was not usable in a commercial environment, Galorath worked to design a more user-friendly software estimation program, which was known as CEI System-3.

By 1988, Dan's company Galorath Inc had introduced what would come to be known as SEER-SEM. SEER-SEM built on the work Galorath had done on Jensen's model and added features such as a graphic user interface. These advances made SEER-SEM an application which could be used by project managers to better estimate the needs for their software applications.

Since its inception, Galorath's SEER-SEM, has been used by companies ranging from aircraft manufacturers Lockheed Martin and Northrop Grumman, to electronics manufacturer Siemens, Bell Helicopter, GKN Aerospace, and even the United States Department of Defense.

In 2001, Galorath received the 2001 International Society of Parametric Analysts (ISPA) Freiman Award for lifetime achievement in parametric modeling.

In 2006, Galorath and Michael W Evans collaborated on Software Sizing, Estimation, and Risk Management, a book about software estimation.

Galorath received a lifetime achievement award in 2009 from the Society of Cost Estimating and Analysis.

Galorath continues to serve as the chief executive officer of Galorath Inc, which is headquartered in El Segundo, California. He is also a member of the Board of Directors of the non-profit organizations Book of Mormon Central, the John A. Widtsoe Foundation, and the ISBSG (International Software Benchmarking Standards Group). Galorath has also published several scholarly articles about software engineering and estimation.

== Personal ==
UCLA and The Wall Street Journal called Galorath out for his health transformation. His diet and exercise regimen was featured in The Wall Street Journal's health section.

== Work ==
- JPL Softcost: software estimation model developed for NASA's Jet Propulsion Laboratory
- CEI System-3: software estimation model based on Dr. Randall Jensen's modifications to the Putnam model
- SEER-SEM: application used to estimate resources needed for developing software
- Galorath, Daniel D.; Evans, Michael W. (2006). Software sizing, estimation, and risk management : when performance is measured performance improves. Boca Raton, FL: Auerbach Publications. ISBN 1-4200-1312-2. OCLC 70272276.
