= Object point =

Object points are an approach used in software development effort estimation under some models such as COCOMO II.

Object points are a way of estimating effort size, similar to source lines of code (SLOC) or function points. They are not necessarily related to objects in object-oriented programming, the objects referred to include screens, reports, and modules of the language. The number of raw objects and complexity of each are estimated and a weighted total Object-Point count is then computed and used to base estimates of the effort needed.

== See also ==
- COCOMO (Constructive Cost Model)
- Comparison of development estimation software
- Function point
- Software development effort estimation
- Software sizing
- Source lines of code
- Use case points
