= Software industry =

Class of businesses specializing in software

The software industry includes businesses for development, maintenance and publication of software that are using different business models, mainly either "license/maintenance based" (on-premises) or "Cloud based" (such as SaaS, PaaS, IaaS, MBaaS, MSaaS, DCaaS etc.). The industry also includes software services, such as training, documentation, consulting and data recovery. The European Commission’s 2025 EU Industrial R&D Investment Scoreboard identified ICT software, ICT hardware, health industries and automotive as the four largest sectoral concentrations of research and development investment among the companies covered. Together, these sectors accounted for more than 80% of R&D investment in the Scoreboard’s global sample of the 2,000 largest corporate R&D investors.

== History ==
The first company founded to provide software products and services was Computer Usage Company in 1955. Before that time, computers were programmed either by customers, or the few commercial computer vendors of the time, such as Sperry Rand and IBM.

The software industry expanded in the early 1960s, shortly after computers became widely available. Demand for software was created by universities, the government, and businesses. Many of these programs were developed by full-time staff programmers in-house. Some were distributed free of charge among users of a particular machine. Others were done on a commercial basis, and other firms such as Computer Sciences Corporation (founded in 1959) started to grow. Other influential or typical software companies begun in the early 1960s included Advanced Computer Techniques, Automatic Data Processing, Applied Data Research, and Informatics General. The computer/hardware makers started bundling operating systems, systems software and programming environments with their machines.

Digital Equipment Corporation (DEC) helped expand access to computing through relatively inexpensive minicomputers. Its PDP-8, introduced in 1965, initially sold for US$18,000. Later versions became smaller and cheaper and were incorporated into other systems by original equipment manufacturers. Some versions were designed for time-sharing and business applications.

The industry expanded greatly with the rise of the personal computer in the latter half of the 1970s, with the TRS-80, Apple II, and Commodore PET all introduced in 1977. The affordability of computers for home use created a growing market for games, applications, and utilities. The IBM PC, introduced in 1981, became a standard for office use.

In the early years of the 21st century, another successful business model has arisen for hosted software, called software-as-a-service, or SaaS; this was at least the third time this model had been attempted. From the point of view of producers of some proprietary software, SaaS reduces the concerns about unauthorized copying, since it can only be accessed through the Web, and by definition no client software is loaded onto the end user's PC.

== Size of the industry ==
Market research firm Gartner estimates the global market for IT spending in 2024 at $3.73 trillion. If telecoms services are included, this will rise to $5.26 trillion. Major companies include Microsoft, HP, Oracle, Dell and IBM.

== Mergers and acquisitions ==
The software industry has been subject to a high degree of consolidation over the past couple of decades. Between 1995 and 2018 around 37,039 mergers and acquisitions have been announced with a total known value of US$1,166 billion. The highest number and value of deals was set in 2000 during the high times of the dot-com bubble with 2,674 transactions valued at US$105 billion. In 2017, 2,547 deals were announced valued at US$111 billion. Approaches to successfully acquire and integrate software companies are available.

== Business models within the software industry ==
Software industry business models include SaaS (subscription-based access to software), PaaS (managing servers), IaaS (pay-as-you-go for scalable infrastructure), and freemium (free with premium features). Others are perpetual licenses (one-time fee), ad-supported (free with ads), open source (free with paid support), pay-per-use (usage-based), and consulting/customization services. Hybrid models combine multiple approaches.

Business models of software companies have been widely discussed. Network effects in software ecosystems, networks of companies, and their customers are an important element in the strategy of software companies.

== See also ==
- Software engineering
- World's largest software companies
- Function point
- Software development effort estimation
- Comparison of development estimation software
- List of AI-assisted software development tools
