= Cost estimation in software engineering =

Software project management activity

Cost estimation in software engineering is typically concerned with the financial spend on the effort to develop and test the software, this can also include requirements review, maintenance, training, managing and buying extra equipment, servers and software. Many methods have been developed for estimating software costs for a given project.

== Methods ==
Methods for estimation in software engineering include these principles:

- Analysis effort method
- Parametric Estimating
- The Planning Game (from Extreme Programming)
- ITK method, also known as Method CETIN
- Proxy-based estimating (PROBE) (from the Personal Software Process)
- Program Evaluation and Review Technique (PERT)
- Putnam model, also known as SLIM
- PRICE Systems Founders of Commercial Parametric models that estimates the scope, cost, effort and schedule for software projects.
- SEER-SEM Parametric Estimation of Effort, Schedule, Cost, Risk. Minimum time and staffing concepts based on Brooks's law
- The Use Case Points method (UCP)
- Weighted Micro Function Points (WMFP)
- Wideband Delphi

Most cost software development estimation techniques involve estimating or measuring software size first and then applying some knowledge of historical of cost per unit of size. Software size is typically sized in SLOC, Function Point or Agile story points.

== See also ==
- Software development effort estimation
- Software metric
- Project management
- Cost overrun
- Risk
- Comparison of development estimation software
- Software maintenance
- Total cost of ownership
