= SMOP =

SMOP or SMOPS may refer to:

- Small matter of programming, a phrase in software development
- School of Maritime Operations (SMOPS), of the Royal Navy; See HMS Mercury
- Singapore Mathematical Olympiad for Primary Schools; See Hwa Chong Institution
- Super Megaton Ohzumo Powers, a wrestling tag team comprising Ryota Hama and Akebono Tarō
