= Ballard Smith =

Ballard Smith may refer to:

- Ballard Smith (Virginia politician), American politician
- Ballard Smith (baseball) (born 1946), American baseball executive, Pennsylvania district attorney
