= AFCAA REVIC =

REVIC
- Developer: Air Force Cost Analysis Agency
- Stable release: 9.2 / Dec 12, 1995
- Operating system: DOS
- Available in: English
- Type: Development effort estimation software
- License: Proprietary Free for public distribution

AFCAA REVIC is a set of programs for use in estimating the cost of software development projects. The Revised Enhanced Version of Intermediate COCOMO (REVIC) model is a copyrighted program available for public distribution under agreement with the REVIC developer, Ray Kile, and the U.S. Air Force Cost Analysis Agency (AFCAA). It is distributed by the U.K. Navy Engineering Process Office (EPO).

It implements a modified version of the COCOMO cost model, adding software maintenance, integration, and testing estimation, as well as several cost multipliers specific for military operational environments.

== Version history ==
- Version 8.7 was released in August 1989.
- Version 8.7.7 was released in December 1990. It added full text editing of input fields, support for full path names when storing or retrieving files, and an ASCII text file output capability.
- Version 9.0 was released in January 1991 at the "REVIC Users Group" meeting in Los Angeles. It included a "fix" to the file saving and retrieval capability when using DOS Version 4.0 and a revised data file format.
- Version 9.01 was released in May 1991. It includes a conversion utility to convert data files created with earlier versions of REVIC (prior to version 9.0) to the new REVIC 9.0 format.
- Version 9.1 was released in November, 1991. It is a maintenance update that makes REVIC compatible with MS-DOS 5.0. Previous versions of REVIC will not load files correctly similar to the previous problem with MS-DOS 4.0/4.01.
- Version 9.11 was released on March 18, 1992. It is a maintenance update that fixes a problem with the number of CSCIs that are saved in the text output file.
- Version 9.2 was released Dec 17, 1994. Primary differences are a number of new Mode-specific and Domain-specific calibrations for Ada based on data collected in 1994. It replaces the term MANAGEMENT RESERVE FOR Risk with the term PLATFORM. It also fixes a problem in calculating the schedule and the display of maintenance man-months when the hours/man-month are changed from the default.

== See also ==
- COCOMO
- COSYSMO
- Software development effort estimation
- Comparison of development estimation software
