= Cost estimation models =

Cost estimation models are mathematical algorithms or parametric equations used to estimate the costs of a product or project. The results of the models are typically necessary to obtain approval to proceed, and are factored into business plans, budgets, and other financial planning and tracking mechanisms.

These algorithms were originally performed manually but now are almost universally computerized. They may be standardized (available in published texts or purchased commercially) or proprietary, depending on the type of business, product, or project in question. Simple models may use standard spreadsheet products.

Models typically function through the input of parameters that describe the attributes of the product or project in question, and possibly physical resource requirements. The model then provides as output various resources requirements in cost and time. Some models concentrate only on estimating project costs (often a single monetary value). Little attention has been given to the development of models for estimating the amount of resources needed for the different elements that comprise a project.

Cost modeling practitioners often have the titles of cost estimators, cost engineers, or parametric analysts.

Typical applications include:

- Construction
- Software Development
- Manufacturing
- New product development

== See also ==
- Software development effort estimation
- Estimation in software engineering
- Parametric Estimating
- Estimation
- Elemental cost planning
- Cost overrun
- Parametric model
- Cost estimate
