= AFCAA =

AFCAA may refer to:

- U.S. Air Force Cost Analysis Agency
  - AFCAA REVIC, a set of programs for estimating the cost of software development projects
- AFC Ann Arbor, an American association football club
- Argentine Film Critics Association Award
