= Productivity (disambiguation) =

Productivity, in economics, is the amount of output created produced per unit input used.

Productivity may also refer to:

- Agricultural productivity, the ratio of agricultural outputs to agricultural inputs.
- Productivity (linguistics), the degree to which a grammatical process can be extended to new cases.
- Productivity (ecology), the rate of generation of biomass in an ecosystem.
- Primary production, in ecology is a measure of the amount of energy incorporated into a biological system.
- Productivity (economic history), the historical role of technology and non technology factors in creating the modern economy.
- Programming productivity, the degree of the ability of individual programmers or development teams to build and evolve software systems.
- Productivity software, application software used for producing information (such as documents, presentations, worksheets, databases, charts, graphs, digital paintings, electronic music and digital video).
- Time management, the process of planning and exercising conscious control over the amount of time spent on specific activities, especially to increase effectiveness, efficiency or productivity.
- Workforce productivity
