= Ballmer Peak =

Concept in computer programming

The Ballmer Peak is a humorous concept invented by Randall Munroe in the xkcd webcomic, joking that a programmer who is appropriately intoxicated (between 0.129% and 0.138% BAC) will achieve a high level of programming productivity; the peak occurs at 0.1337%, a reference to leet. The concept is loosely tied to former Microsoft CEO, Steve Ballmer, and is likely a play on Balmer series of hydrogen spectral lines named for the scientist Johann Balmer.

A San Francisco organization, Originate, has organized a "Ballmer Peak-A-Thon", an open bar event where people were given "5 hours to find the elusive Ballmer peak, and build the best worst business possible."

There is no scientific basis for the Ballmer Peak, though researchers have studied adjacent topics, such as the impact of inebriation on problem solving. One study identified worse programming performance with increasing blood alcohol content, but joked in a footnote that as "the prescribed BAC in this experiment did not reach the Ballmer Peak", they did not technically refute the concept. In addition, the Ballmer Peak has been the subject of satirical academic studies, including a 2024 paper presented at SIGBOVIK, a satirical computer science conference organized by Carnegie Mellon students, which caught broader attention in the programming community. That study, which tested blood alcohol levels of only one male subject tackling competitive computer programming questions, found no evidence of a sudden "peak" of programming ability but did generally find that speed of solving the challenges increased with some alcohol consumption before a rapid decline.

By the time of Ballmer's 2013 announcement of his retirement from Microsoft, the concept of the "Ballmer Peak" was entrenched enough that media joked that the actual Ballmer Peak was the resulting jump in stock price.

== See also ==
- Dutch courage
- Alcohol use among college students
