= Ballard Smith (baseball) =

American baseball executive (born 1946)

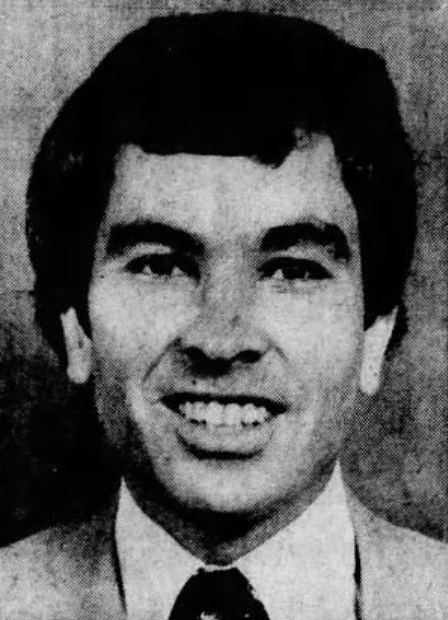
- Smith in 1981
- Born: June 20, 1946 (age 80); Indianapolis, Indiana, U.S.

Teams
- San Diego Padres (1977–1987)

Ballard F. Smith (born June 20, 1946) is an American former sports executive who was president of the San Diego Padres of Major League Baseball from 1979 to 1987. He was a district attorney in Pennsylvania before starting his sports career as vice president of the San Diego Mariners of the World Hockey Association (WHA).

== Early life ==
Smith was born in Indianapolis, Indiana, and attended Glenbrook North High School in Northbrook, Illinois. After graduating from Carleton College and the University of Minnesota Law School, he was an attorney for five years in Meadville, Pennsylvania, before being elected district attorney of Crawford County, Pennsylvania, in 1975. Smith was the youngest district attorney in the state at the time. He grew disillusioned with politics, and resigned from his four-year term in 1976 to work in sports management for his stepfather-in-law, Ray Kroc, the owner of the McDonald's hamburger chain.

== Sports career ==
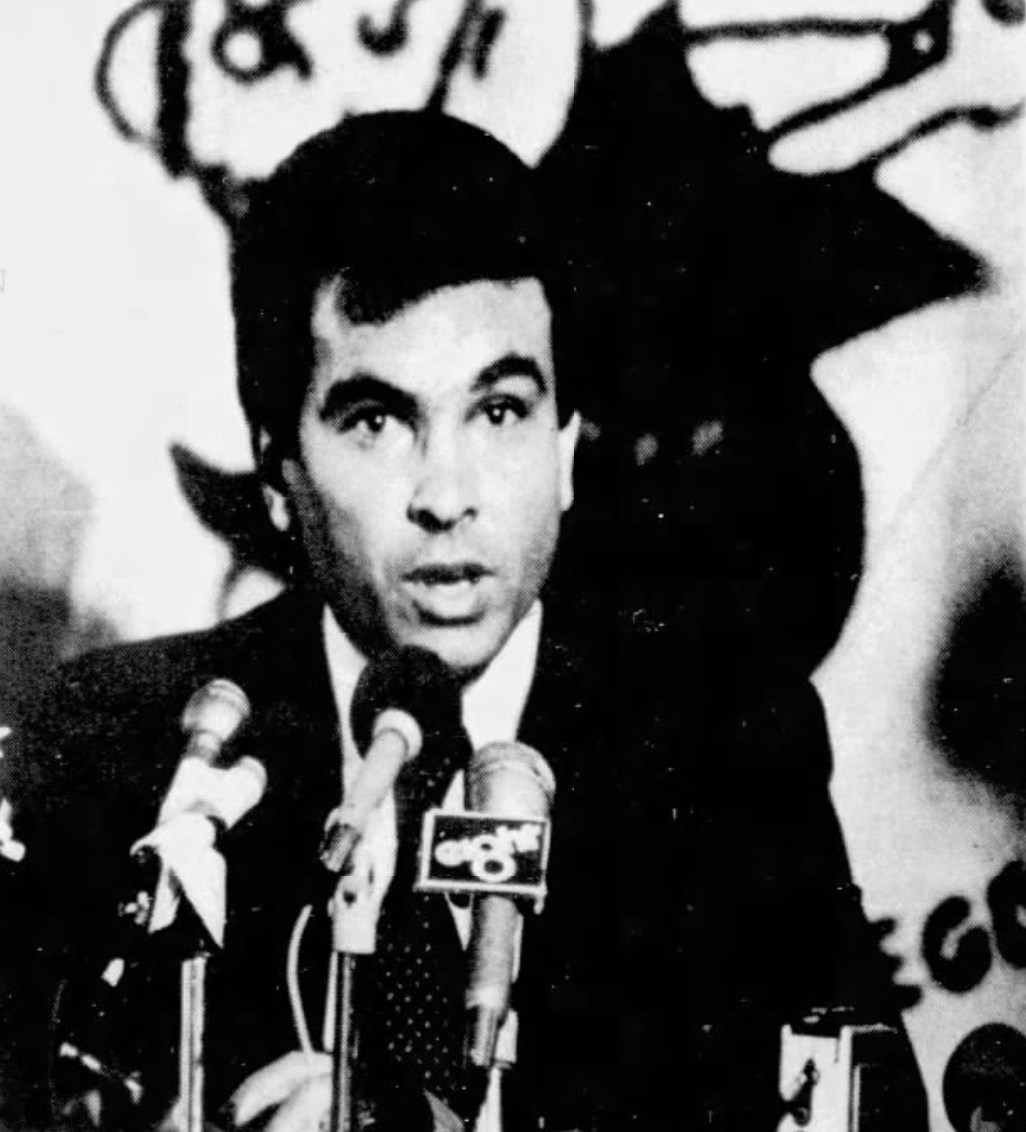
Smith with the San Diego Padres in 1981

Smith joined the front office of San Diego Mariners, a WHA team recently purchased by Kroc. Smith was vice president and general manager of the Mariners before joining Kroc's San Diego Padres as vice president in 1977. In 1979, he succeeded Kroc as team president.

Ordered to control spending, Smith enabled the 1983 free agent signing of first baseman Steve Garvey after persuading Ace Parking and KFMB-AM radio to invest money in the Padres, convincing them that their revenues would increase if the team succeeded. In 1984, the Padres signed relief pitcher Goose Gossage using a long-term annuity at the suggestion of Dick Freeman, the team's chief financial officer, an innovative move to lessen the immediate financial obligations. Padres general manager Jack McKeon also arranged to acquire third baseman Graig Nettles in a trade with the New York Yankees. However, with Yankees owner George Steinbrenner wanting to talk to team owners, not McKeon, Smith finalized the deal on the account of being Kroc's son-in-law. That season, the Padres won their first National League pennant. Smith also served on the executive committee of Major League Baseball from 1981 to 1985.

In 1986, the Padres banned beer in the clubhouse. Smith commented that the team's potential legal responsibility along with a 3,000 percent rise in liability insurance in eight years led to the decision. Gossage was fined and suspended by the team after criticizing Smith and Padres owner Joan Kroc for the ban. Fans blamed Smith in 1987 for failing to sign free agent Tim Raines, who was offered a two-year contract for $1.1 million annually by San Diego after he made $1.5 million the previous year with Montreal. Smith resigned from the Padres mid-season in 1987.

== Later years ==
Smith also served on the board of directors of McDonald's from 1983 to 1997. He subsequently moved to Idaho and to other business interests and activities. In 2012, Smith co-founded an educational non-profit called Science of Sport with University of Arizona professor Ricardo Valerdi aimed at promoting STEM education through sports examples. Smith served as their executive director.

== Personal life ==
Smith was married for 16 years to Linda Smith, the only child of Joan Kroc and stepdaughter of Ray Kroc. Linda filed for divorce in 1987. The couple had four daughters together.
