= Vierordt's law =

Law of time perception

Relative constant error in time perception using Vierordt's Law

Karl von Vierordt in 1868 was the first to record a law of time perception which relates perceived duration to actual duration over different interval magnitudes, and according to task complexity. It states that, retrospectively, "short" intervals of time (e.g., 10 seconds) tend to be overestimated, and "long" intervals of time tend to be underestimated. To put it more objectively, if a person reproduced different intervals in a time range, the shorter intervals tended to be reproduced as longer and longer intervals were reproduced as shorter in reality. Also in between these shorter and longer intervals, there is an in-different interval where the time is accurately perceived and thus is neither overestimated nor underestimated.

The other major paradigm of time estimation methodology measures time prospectively as seen in the time measurement experiments in which subjects produced, reproduced or verbally estimated time intervals. This predates the modern scalar expectancy theory (SET) developed in 1984. Modern research suggests that "Vierordt's law is caused by an unnatural yet widely used experimental protocol". Hence this law comes under the field of experimental psychology.

== Applications ==
It is widely used in psychology studies for classical methods of time estimation over different intervals of time; some really short (in ms) and some long (e.g., 10 seconds).

It is also found to be present in drug addicted users which appears differently for both short term and long term users. Also the alteration in time perception is dependent on type of drugs consumed and amount of dose.

For instance, the time people estimated to commute by car to Sydney central business district was reported as longer, while those travelling by train estimated shorter times.

== See also ==
- Hofstadter's law – Adage referring to time estimates
- Dyschronometria – Inability to estimate amount of time that has passed or will pass
