= Small matter of programming =

Ironic phrase in software development

In software development, small matter of programming (SMOP) or simple matter of programming is a phrase used to ironically indicate that a suggested feature or design change would require a great deal of effort.

It points out that although the change is clearly possible, it would be very laborious to perform. It often implies that the person proposing the feature underestimates its cost.

== Definitions ==
The 1983 Jargon File describes an SMOP as follows:

SMOP (ess'em'oh'pee') noun.

An acronym for "a Small Matter Of Programming". A piece of program code, not yet written, whose anticipated length is significantly greater than its intellectual complexity.

This term is used to refer to a program that could obviously be written but is not worth the trouble. It is also used ironically to imply that a difficult problem can be easily solved because a program can be written to do it. The irony is that it is very clear that writing such a program will be a great deal of work.

Example: "It's easy to change a FORTRAN compiler to compile COBOL as well; it's just a small matter of programming."

The IBM Jargon Dictionary defines SMOP as:

SMOP (smop) n. Something quite possible, but requiring unavailable resources to achieve. "Why isn't that function available in the program?" − "It's just a Simple Matter Of Programming". (The implication being that, given a few person-centuries, all things are possible.) Also SMOUP (smoop), a Simple Matter Of Micro-Programming (if handwritten, using a Greek mu). See also how hard would it be.

== Usage ==
SMOP was among the "games" described in an article as paralleling the Games People Play identified by Dr. Eric Berne in the field of self-help psychology. The game essentially consists of proposing seemingly simple adjustments to a design, leading to unexpected consequences and delays.

Alternative phrases such as simple matter of software or small matter of software are occasionally used in the same manner. However, the phrase is also used without irony to indicate that straightforward software development is all that is required to resolve some issue. This usage is often invoked when the speaker wants to contrast the implied ease of software changes with the suggested greater difficulty of making a hardware change or a change to an industry standard. This non-ironic usage is more often invoked by senior management and hardware engineers, than it is by software engineers.

The term was also explored and expanded upon by computer scientist Bonnie Nardi in her 1993 book A Small Matter of Programming: Perspectives on End User Computing.

== See also ==
- Ninety–ninety rule – Humorous aphorism in computer programming
- Hofstadter's law – Adage referring to time estimates
- Hard–easy effect – Cognitive bias relating to mis-estimating success based on perceived difficulty
- Planning fallacy – Cognitive bias of underestimating time needed
