= Analysis effort method =

The analysis effort method is a method for estimating the duration of software engineering projects. It is best suited to producing initial estimates for the length of a job based on a known time duration for preparing a specification. Inputs to the method are numeric factors which indicate Size (S), Familiarity (F) and Complexity (C). These, with a duration for preparing the software specification can be used in a look up table (which contains factors based on previous experience) to determine with length of each of the following phases of the work. These being Design, Coding and Unit testing and Testing. The method does not include any times for training or project management.

This method should be used as one of a number of estimation techniques to obtain a more accurate estimate.
