= Costimator =

Cost estimating software

Costimator is an American series of cost estimating software developed by Thomas Charkiewicz in 1982 and is designed to model manufacturing costs. The software is designed, developed and marketed by MTI of West Springfield, Massachusetts.

== History ==
Costimator was designed by Thomas Charkiewicz, a former machinist and manufacturing manager who studied computer-aided manufacturing at the University of Massachusetts. Costimator was released in late 1982, designed to model manufacturing costs.

In 2002, IBM bought Costimator OEM from MTI Systems, Inc. Many of the products on the market focused on machine shop operations. Costimator had its roots in the machining industry, but later branched out to include several other manufacturing processes.

John Kagan, the former manager of PC Cost Management at IBM and Lenovo estimated that between 2003 and 2004, IBM saved more than $10 million using Costimator.

Costimator also includes a function known as IQ builder which customers can use to model their own manufacturing process based on historical data. The data was derived from the company’s customers in addition to various independent industry sources. Labor costs come from the U.S. Bureau of Labor Statistics.

In 2009, MTI Systems, Inc. reached an agreement with European distributor Premier Manufacturing Solutions, LTD (Stockport, UK) to market its flagship products Costimator OEM and Costimator JS to companies throughout Europe. In February 2011, Cimtronics and MTI Systems, Inc. also agreed to terms on a distribution partnership.
