= Planning poker =

Technique for estimating

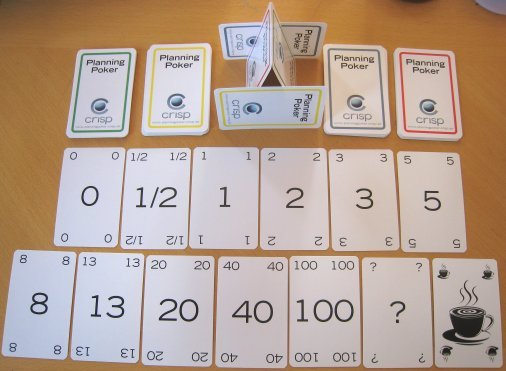
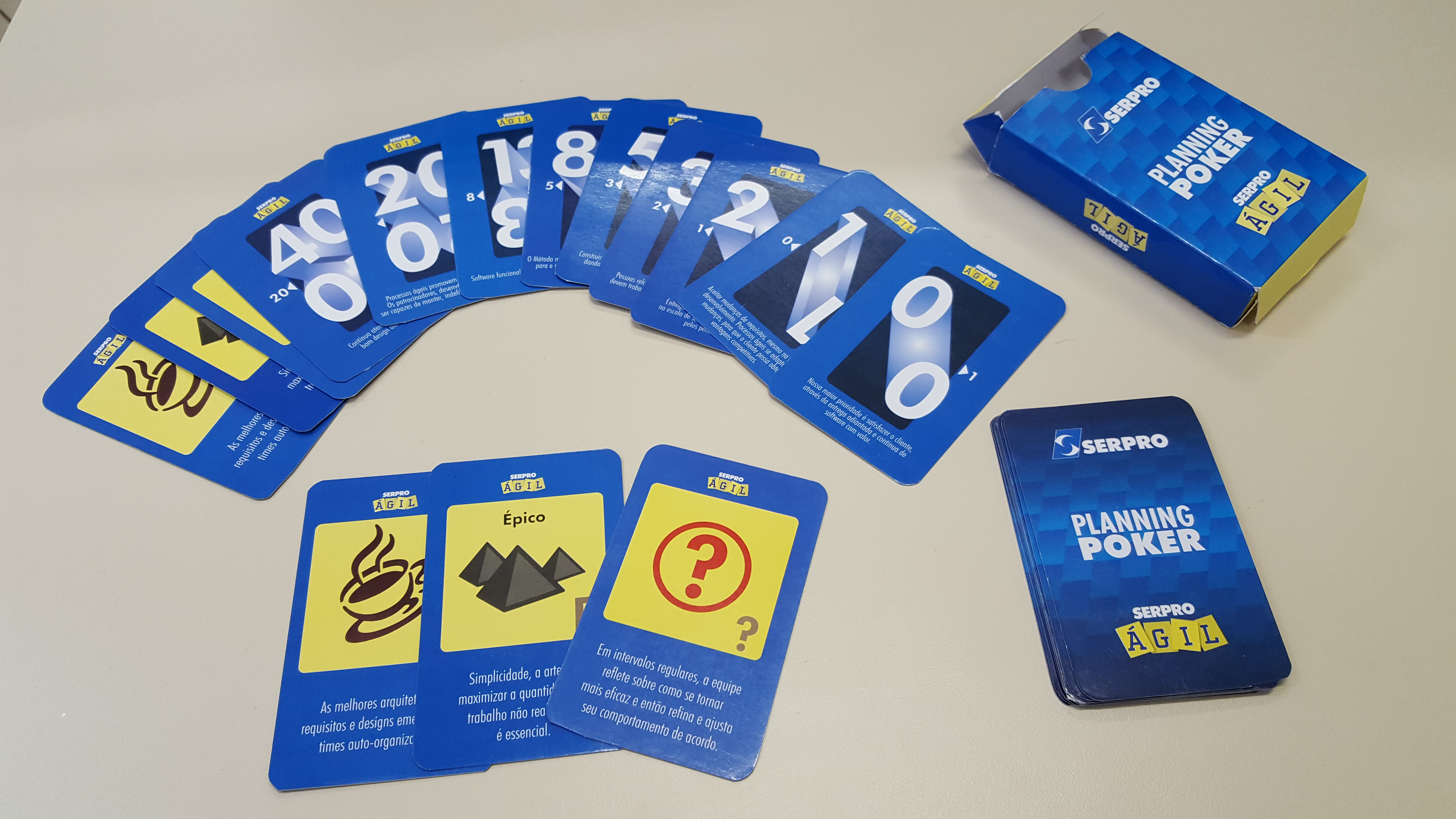
Planning poker decks

Planning poker, also called Scrum poker, is a consensus-based, gamified technique for estimating, mostly used for timeboxing in Agile principles. In planning poker, members of the group make estimates by playing numbered cards face-down to the table, instead of speaking them aloud. The cards are revealed, and the estimates are then discussed. By hiding the figures in this way, the group can avoid the cognitive bias of anchoring, where the first number spoken aloud sets a precedent for subsequent estimates.

Planning poker is a variation of the Wideband delphi method. It is most commonly used in agile software development, in particular in Scrum and Extreme Programming. Agile software development methods recommend the use of Planning Poker for estimating the size of user stories and developing release and iteration plans.

The method was first defined and named by James Grenning in 2002 and later popularized by Mike Cohn in the book Agile Estimating and Planning, whose company trade marked the term and a digital online tool.

== Process ==
=== Rationale ===
The reason to use planning poker is to avoid the influence of the other participants. If a number is spoken, it can sound like a suggestion and influence the other participants' sizing. Planning poker should force people to think independently and propose their numbers simultaneously. This is accomplished by requiring that all participants show their cards at the same time.

=== Equipment ===
Planning poker is based on a list of features to be delivered, several copies of a deck of cards, and optionally, an egg timer that can be used to limit time spent in discussion of each item.

The feature list, often a list of user stories, describes some software that needs to be developed.

The cards in the deck have numbers on them. A typical deck has cards showing the Fibonacci sequence including a zero: 0, 1, 2, 3, 5, 8, 13, 21, 34, 55, 89; other decks use similar progressions with a fixed ratio between each value such as 1, 2, 4, 8, etc.

The reason for using the Fibonacci sequence instead of simply doubling each subsequent value is because estimating a task as exactly double the effort as another task is misleadingly precise. A task that is about twice as much effort as a 5, has to be evaluated as either a bit less than double (8) or a bit more than double (13).

Several commercially available decks use the sequence: 0, ½, 1, 2, 3, 5, 8, 13, 20, 40, 100, and optionally a ? (unsure), an infinity symbol (this task cannot be completed), and a coffee cup (I need a break, and I will make the rest of the team coffee). The reason for not exactly following the Fibonacci sequence after 13 is because someone once said to Mike Cohn "You must be very certain to have estimated that task as 21 instead of 20." Using numbers with only a single digit of precision (except for 13) indicates the uncertainty in the estimation. Alternatively standard playing cards of Ace, 2, 3, 5, 8, and king can be used. Where king means: "this item is too big or too complicated to estimate". "Throwing a king" ends the discussion of the item for the current sprint.

When teams are not in the same geographical locations, collaborative software over the internet can be used as replacement for physical cards. Several web applications and mobile applications exist for the purpose.

=== Procedure ===
At the estimation meeting, each estimator is given one deck of the cards. All decks have identical sets of cards in them.

The meeting proceeds as follows:

- A Moderator, who will not play, chairs the meeting.
- The Product Owner provides a short overview of one user story to be estimated. The team is given an opportunity to ask questions and discuss to clarify assumptions and risks. A summary of the discussion is recorded, e.g. by the Moderator.
- Each individual lays a card face down representing their estimate for the story. Units used vary - they can be days duration, ideal days, t-shirt sizes or story points. During the discussion, estimations must not be mentioned at all in relation to feature size to avoid anchoring.
- Everyone calls their cards simultaneously by turning them over.
- People with high estimates and low estimates are given a soap box to offer their justification for their estimate and then the discussion continues.
- Repeat the estimation process until a consensus is reached. The developer who was likely to own the deliverable has a large portion of the "consensus vote", although the Moderator can negotiate the consensus.
- To ensure that discussion is structured; the Moderator or the Product Owner may at any point turn over the egg timer and when it runs out all discussion must cease and another round of poker is played. The structure in the conversation is re-introduced by the soapboxes.

The cards are numbered as they are to account for the fact that the longer an estimate is, the more uncertainty it contains. Thus, if a developer wants to play a 6 they are forced to reconsider and either work through that some of the perceived uncertainty does not exist and play a 5, or accept a conservative estimate accounting for the uncertainty and play an 8.

== See also ==
- Comparison of scrum software, which generally has support for planning poker, either included or as an optional add-on.
