= Ricardo Valerdi =

Mexican computer scientist

- Born: Ensenada, Mexico
- Citizenship: United States, Mexico
- Education: University of San Diego, University of Southern California
- Occupations: Sports Analytics, Systems Engineering, Cost Estimation
- Scientific career
- Workplaces: Massachusetts Institute of Technology, University of Arizona
- Thesis: The Constructive Systems Engineering Cost Model (2005)
- Doctoral advisor: Barry W. Boehm

Ricardo Valerdi is a computer scientist, who is Distinguished Outreach Professor in the Department of Systems and Industrial Engineering at the University of Arizona. His research interests encompass systems engineering, cost estimation, and sports analytics. Valerdi is known for founding and serving as co-editor-in-chief of the Journal of Enterprise Transformation, and he has also held the position of editor-in-chief for the Journal of Cost Analysis and Parametric.

Ricardo Valerdi is a Fellow of the International Council on Systems Engineering (INCOSE) and a foreign member of the Mexican Academy of Engineering. He has held several academic positions, including Visiting Fellow at the UK Royal Academy of Engineering, Visiting Professor at the United States Military Academy at West Point, and Fulbright Scholar at Universidad Carlos III in Madrid, Spain. Valerdi also serves as the Faculty Athletics Representative for the University of Arizona, where he acts as a liaison to the Big 12 Conference and the NCAA.

== Early life and education ==
Ricardo Valerdi obtained his PhD in Industrial and Systems Engineering from the University of Southern California in Los Angeles in 2005. During his doctoral studies, he developed the Constructive Systems Engineering Cost Model (COSYSMO), a parametric model designed to estimate the cost, effort, and schedule of large-scale systems engineering projects. COSYSMO is utilised in both industry and government to improve the accuracy of cost estimation for complex systems. In addition to his PhD, Valerdi holds a Master of Science in System Architecture and Engineering from the University of Southern California and a Bachelor of Science in Electrical Engineering from the University of San Diego.

His doctoral advisor was renowned computer scientist Barry W. Boehm

== Career ==
Ricardo Valerdi was a faculty member in the Engineering Systems Division at the Massachusetts Institute of Technology (MIT) from 2005 to 2011. His research during this period concentrated on systems engineering, cost estimation, and decision-making tools for large-scale systems. Valerdi collaborated with various organizations, including the Department of Defence and NASA.

In 2011, Ricardo Valerdi joined the Department of Systems and Industrial Engineering at the University of Arizona. His work at the university includes research in systems engineering, community engagement, and educational outreach. In 2012, he founded Science of Sport, a non-profit organization that aims to promote STEM (science, technology, engineering, and mathematics) education through sports, in collaboration with Tech Launch Arizona. The organization partners with schools, community groups, and professional sports organizations to provide curricula, teacher training, and hands-on activities. Valerdi served as the interim department head during the 2022-2023 academic year and was appointed department head in 2023. He has mentored numerous graduate students and contributed to the development of engineering programs at the University of Arizona. His research has received several awards, and his publications have influenced both academic and industry sectors.

He is the author of a decision-making book The Five-Tool Team (Regalo Press 2026) based on his work at SpaceX, Major League Baseball, and the U.S. Army. The book has forewords written by NFL coach John Harbaugh and NCAA basketball coach Tommy Lloyd.

== Awards and honors ==
• In 2013, Ricardo Valerdi received the Best Journal Article of the Year award from the Defense Acquisition Research Journal.

• In 2015, Ricardo Valerdi was awarded the Frank Freiman Award for Lifetime Achievement in Cost Estimation and Parametric Modeling.

• In 2016, Ricardo Valerdi received the Best Paper Award from the Journal of Systems Engineering, an honor presented by the International Council on Systems Engineering during the summer.

• In 2016, Ricardo Valerdi was recognized as the winner of the NCAA MindMatters Concussion Education Program.
