= COSYSMO =

The Constructive Systems Engineering Cost Model (COSYSMO) was created by Ricardo Valerdi while at the University of Southern California Center for Software Engineering. It gives an estimate of the number of person-months it will take to staff systems engineering resources on hardware and software projects. Initially developed in 2002, the model now contains a calibration data set of more than 50 projects provided by major aerospace and defense companies such as Raytheon, Northrop Grumman, Lockheed Martin, SAIC, General Dynamics, and BAE Systems.

Similar to its predecessor COCOMO, COSYSMO computes effort (and cost) as a function of system functional size and adjusts it based on a number of environmental factors related to systems engineering.

COSYSMO's central cost estimating relationship, or CER is of the form: $PM_{NS}=A \times \text{size}^E \times \prod^n_{i=1} EM_i$

where "Size" is one of four size additive size drivers, and EM represents one of fourteen multiplicative effort multipliers.

== See also ==
- Comparison of development estimation software
- Software development effort estimation
