= Hofstadter's law =

Adage referring to time estimates

Hofstadter's law is a self-referential adage, coined by Douglas Hofstadter in his book Gödel, Escher, Bach: An Eternal Golden Braid (1979) to describe the widely experienced difficulty of accurately estimating the time it will take to complete tasks of substantial complexity:

Hofstadter's law: It always takes longer than you expect, even when you take into account Hofstadter's law.

The law is often cited by programmers in discussions of techniques to improve productivity, such as The Mythical Man-Month or extreme programming.

== History ==
In 1979, Hofstadter introduced the law in connection with a discussion of chess-playing computers, which at the time were continually being beaten by top-level human players, despite outpacing humans in depth of analysis. Hofstadter wrote:

In the early days of computer chess, people used to estimate that it would be ten years until a computer (or program) was world champion. But after ten years had passed, it seemed that the day a computer would become world champion was still more than ten years away... This is just one more piece of evidence for the rather recursive Hofstadter's Law.

In 1997, the chess computer Deep Blue became the first to beat a human champion by defeating Garry Kasparov.

== See also ==
- Law of Accelerating Returns – Increase in the rate of technological change through history
- Lindy effect – Theorized increase of longevity with age
- List of eponymous laws – Adages and sayings named after a person
- Ninety–ninety rule – Humorous aphorism in computer programming
- Optimism bias – Type of cognitive bias
- Parkinson's law – Adage that work expands to fill its available time
- Planning fallacy – Cognitive bias of underestimating time needed
- Reference class forecasting – Method of predicting the future
- Student syndrome – Planned procrastination
- Valve Time – Discrepancy between promised and actual release date
- Vierordt's law – Law of time perception
