= PRICE Systems =

Cost estimation software company

PRICE Systems was founded in 1975 as a business within the RCA Corporation. It is generally acknowledged as the earliest developer of parametric cost estimation software.

PRICE Systems’ cost estimating software was first developed in the 1970s when David Shore, a vice president in RCA's Government Group discovered that Frank Freiman, in the purchasing department, was able to predict the cost of military new systems with considerable accuracy before design was completed and a parts breakdown was available for cost estimation. Mr. Shore teamed Freiman with William Rapp, who transferred Freiman's relationships to software that could be run on a computer. This was used in a proposal RCA made to the USAF. When questioned by the Air Force, a presentation was made to them by Shore, Freiman and Rapp. The USAF demanded that RCA make this capability available to the entire industry as a condition for accepting its use.

Shore established a new group to be headed by Freiman to develop and run an organization which Freiman named Programmed Review of Information for Costing and Evaluation (PRICE). PRICE related the basic costs of engineering and production to parameters that included a specification profile of units to be built, amount of work to be performed, the allowed schedule and resources available. It relied on the use of parametric relationships obtained through curve-fitting procedures that had been performed on a historical repository of significant cost data.

Originally a division of RCA and later a strategic business unit of Lockheed Martin, PRICE Systems is considered the pioneer in the science of parametric modeling because the PRICE parametric models were the first generally available computerized cost estimation software. PRICE became an independent, privately held company in 1998. Anthony DeMarco is the President and Managing Member of PRICE Systems L.L.C.

== Chronology ==
The company's key dates are as follows:

- 1969 RCA's Frank Freiman invents parametric cost modeling for estimating acquisition and development of hardware systems
- 1973 Frank Freiman founds PRICE Systems as part of RCA
- 1986 GE acquires RCA; RCA PRICE Systems becomes GE PRICE Systems
- 1992 Martin Marietta acquires GE Aerospace; GE PRICE Systems becomes Martin Marietta PRICE Systems
- 1995 Lockheed Corporation merges with Martin Marietta to form Lockheed Martin; PRICE Systems becomes a division of Lockheed Martin
- 1998 Management buyout from Lockheed Martin; PRICE Systems LLC formed as independent company
- 2021 Company acquisition by Unison Global; PRICE Systems LLC is bought by Unison Global.

== Technology ==
In 1976 PRICE introduced its Hardware Life-Cycle Cost Model. This was followed in 1977 by a Software Development Cost Model, one of the oldest and most widely used software parametric models for large-scale software development projects. In 1983 the company launched its first application for microcircuit cost modelling.

TruePlanning

In 2003 PRICE released TruePlanning, a proprietary parametric model that estimates the scope, cost, effort, and schedule for software projects. Parametric estimating models are mathematical models containing cost estimating relationships (CERs) developed through data collection and regression analysis. The TruePlanning Software model provides activity-based parametric models to aid in the estimation of new software development, integrations of Commercial Off-the-Shelf (COTS) Software and life cycle maintenance costs.

Today, TruePlanning is used to estimate the costs, schedule, effort, and benefits for:

- Hardware Life Cycle programs (mechanical and electronic)
- Software projects
- IT Projects
- System of Systems configurations

== Customers ==
Customers include DOD Program Office, BAE Systems, Boeing NA, Eurocopter, Gulfstream Aerospace, NASA, US Naval Air Systems Command (NAVAIR), Penn State Applied Research Laboratories (ARL), Sikorsky Aircraft and United Technologies Corporation.
