= Proxy-based estimating =

Proxy-Based Estimating (PROBE) is an estimating process used in the Personal Software Process (PSP) to estimate size and effort.

Proxy Based Estimating (PROBE), is the estimation method introduced by Watts Humphrey (of the Software Engineering Institute at Carnegie Mellon University) as part of the Personal Software Process (a discipline that helps individual software engineers monitor, test, and improve their own work).

PROBE is based on the idea that if an engineer is building a component similar to one they built previously, then it will take about the same effort as it did in the past.

In the PROBE method, individual engineers use a database to keep track of the size and effort of all of the work that they do, developing a history of the effort they have put into their past projects, broken into individual components. Each component in the database is assigned a type (“calculation,” “data,” “logic,” etc.) and a size (from “very small” to “very large”). When a new project must be estimated, it is broken down into tasks that correspond to these types and sizes. A formula based on linear regression is used to calculate the estimate for each task.

Additional information on PROBE can be found in A Discipline for Software Engineering by Watts Humphrey (Addison Wesley, 1994).

== See also ==
- Estimation in software engineering
