= Computer Economics =

IT research firm

- Industry: Technology industry
- Founded: 1979; 47 years ago
- Founder: Bruno Bassi
- Headquarters: El Segundo, California
- Parent: Avasant Research
- Website: computereconomics.com

Computer Economics is an IT research firm focusing on the strategic and financial management of information systems. It was founded in 1979 by Bruno Bassi and is currently headquartered in El Segundo, California, USA. Clients include IT organizations, consulting firms, and financial services firms in North America and other countries. Computer Economics research provides IT metrics in six categories along with practical advice backed up by annual surveys of IT decision makers.

Its Computer Economics Report, first published in 1979, was a monthly newsletter related to IT cost management. Its IT Spending, Staffing, and Worldwide Technology Trends study, first published in 1990, is based on its annual survey of IT executives in the U.S. and Canada. The firm also publishes special reports on IT spending and staffing metrics, IT salaries, IT security, malware, and other topics. In addition, the firm maintains data on vendor pricing and discounting, fair market values, and residual value forecasts for computer hardware.

Computer Economics is a service of Avasant Research.
