= Software parametric models =

A parametric model is a set of related mathematical equations that incorporates variable parameters. A scenario is defined by selecting a value for each parameter. Software project managers use software parametric models and parametric estimation tools to estimate their projects' duration, staffing and cost.

In the early 1980s refinements to earlier models, such as PRICE S and SLIM, and new models, such as SPQR, Checkpoint, ESTIMACS, SEER-SEM or COCOMO and its commercial implementations PCOC, Costimator, GECOMO, COSTAR and Before You Leap emerged.

The prime advantage of these models is that they are objective, repeatable, calibrated and easy to use, although calibration to previous experience may be a disadvantage when applied to a significantly different project.

These models were highly effective for waterfall model, version 1 software projects of the 1980s and highlighted the early achievements of parametrics. As systems became more complex and new languages emerged, different software parametric models emerged that employed new cost estimating relationships, risk analyzers, software sizing, nonlinear software reuse, and personnel continuity.

== See also ==
- Software Product Lines Online Tools
