= Wideband delphi =

Estimation method in project management

The Wideband Delphi estimation method is a consensus-based technique for estimating effort. It derives from the Delphi method which was developed in the 1950-1960s at the RAND Corporation as a forecasting tool. It has since been adapted across many industries to estimate many kinds of tasks, ranging from statistical data collection results to sales and marketing forecasts. According to the Project Management Institute, Wideband Delphi is an "estimating method in which subject matter experts go through multiple rounds of producing estimates individually, with a team discussion after each round, until a consensus is achieved."

== Wideband Delphi Process ==
Barry Boehm and John A. Farquhar originated the Wideband variant of the Delphi method in the 1970s. They called it "wideband" because, compared to the existing delphi method, the new method involved greater interaction and more communication among those participating. The method was popularized by Boehm's book Software Engineering Economics (1981). Boehm's original steps from this book were:

1. Coordinator presents each expert with a specification and an estimation form.
2. Coordinator calls a group meeting in which the experts discuss estimation issues with the coordinator and each other.
3. Experts fill out forms anonymously.
4. Coordinator prepares and distributes a summary of the estimates
5. Coordinator calls a group meeting, specifically focusing on having the experts discuss points where their estimates vary widely
6. Experts fill out forms, again anonymously, and steps 4 to 6 are iterated for as many rounds as appropriate.

A variant of Wideband Delphi was developed by Neil Potter and Mary Sakry of The Process Group. In this process, a project manager selects a moderator and an estimation team with three to seven members. The Delphi process consists of two meetings run by the moderator. The first meeting is the kickoff meeting, during which the estimation team creates a work breakdown structure (WBS) and discusses assumptions. After the meeting, each team member creates an effort estimate for each task. The second meeting is the estimation session, in which the team revises the estimates as a group and achieves consensus. After the estimation session, the project manager summarizes the results and reviews them with the team, at which point they are ready to be used as the basis for planning the project.

- Choose the team. The project manager selects the estimation team and a moderator. The team should consist of 3 to 7 project team members. The team should include representatives from every engineering group that will be involved in the development of the work product being estimated.
- Kickoff meeting. The moderator prepares the team and leads a discussion to brainstorm assumptions, generate a WBS and decide on the units of estimation.
- Individual preparation. After the kickoff meeting, each team member individually generates the initial estimates for each task in the WBS, documenting any changes to the WBS and missing assumptions.
- Estimation session. The moderator leads the team through a series of iterative steps to gain consensus on the estimates. At the start of the iteration, the moderator charts the estimates on the whiteboard so the estimators can see the range of estimates. The team resolves issues and revises estimates without revealing specific numbers. The cycle repeats until either no estimator wants to change his or her estimate or the estimators agree that the range is acceptable.
- Assemble tasks. The project manager works with the team to collect the estimates from the team members at the end of the meeting and compiles the final task list, estimates and assumptions.
- Review results. The project manager reviews the final task list with the estimation team.

== See also ==
- The Wisdom of Crowds
- Delphi method
- Planning poker
