= COCOMO =

Software cost estimation model

The Constructive Cost Model (COCOMO) is a parametric software cost estimation model developed by Barry W. Boehm. The model parameters are derived from fitting a regression formula using data from historical projects (63 projects for COCOMO 81 and 161 projects for COCOMO II).

== History ==
The constructive cost model was developed by Barry W. Boehm in the late 1970s and published in Boehm's 1981 book Software Engineering Economics as a model for estimating effort, cost, and schedule for software projects. It drew on a study of 63 projects at TRW Aerospace where Boehm was Director of Software Research and Technology. The study examined projects ranging in size from 2,000 to 100,000 lines of code, and programming languages ranging from assembly to PL/I. These projects were based on the waterfall model of software development which was the prevalent software development process in 1981.

References to this model typically call it COCOMO 81. In 1995 COCOMO II was developed and finally published in 2000 in the book Software Cost Estimation with COCOMO II. COCOMO II is the successor of COCOMO 81 and is claimed to be better suited for estimating modern software development projects; providing support for more recent software development processes and was tuned using a larger database of 161 projects. The need for the new model came as software development technology moved from mainframe and overnight batch processing to desktop development, code reusability, and the use of off-the-shelf software components.

COCOMO consists of a hierarchy of three increasingly detailed and accurate forms. The first level, Basic COCOMO is good for quick, early, rough order of magnitude estimates of software costs, but its accuracy is limited due to its lack of factors to account for difference in project attributes (Cost Drivers). Intermediate COCOMO takes these Cost Drivers into account and Detailed COCOMO additionally accounts for the influence of individual project phases. The last one is Complete COCOMO model which addresses the shortcomings of both basic & intermediate.

== Tools ==
An online COCOMO II tool implementation of the model is available for software cost estimation. It is developed by Ray Madachy, a co-author of COCOMO II, and conforms to the book definition for the post-architecture model. An example estimate from the tool is shown below.

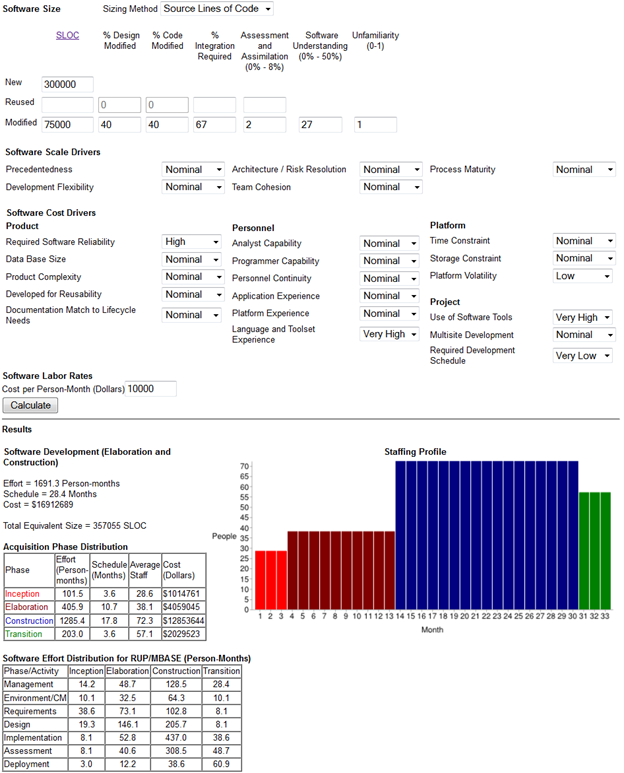
Example software cost estimate from COCOMO II tool.

== Intermediate COCOMO ==
Intermediate COCOMO computes software development effort as function of program size and a set of "cost drivers" that include subjective assessment of product, hardware, personnel and project attributes. This extension considers a set of four "cost drivers", each with a number of subsidiary attributes:

- Product attributes
  - Required software reliability extent
  - Size of application database
  - Complexity of the product
- Hardware attributes
  - Run-time performance constraints
  - Memory constraints
  - Volatility of the virtual machine environment
  - Required turnabout time
- Personnel attributes
  - Analyst capability
  - Software engineering capability
  - Applications experience
  - Virtual machine experience
  - Programming language experience
- Project attributes
  - Use of software tools
  - Application of software engineering methods
  - Required development schedule

Each of the 15 attributes receives a rating on a six-point scale that ranges from "very low" to "extra high" (in importance or value). An effort multiplier from the table below applies to the rating. The product of all effort multipliers results in an effort adjustment factor (EAF). Typical values for EAF range from 0.9 to 1.4.

Cost Drivers	Ratings					
Cost Drivers	Very Low	Low	Nominal	High	Very High	Extra High
Product attributes
Required software reliability	0.75	0.88	1.00	1.15	1.40	
Size of application database		0.94	1.00	1.08	1.16	
Complexity of the product	0.70	0.85	1.00	1.15	1.30	1.65
Hardware attributes
Run-time performance constraints			1.00	1.11	1.30	1.66
Memory constraints			1.00	1.06	1.21	1.56
Volatility of the virtual machine environment		0.87	1.00	1.15	1.30	
Required turnabout time		0.87	1.00	1.07	1.15	
Personnel attributes
Analyst capability	1.46	1.19	1.00	0.86	0.71	
Applications experience	1.29	1.13	1.00	0.91	0.82	
Software engineer capability	1.42	1.17	1.00	0.86	0.70	
Virtual machine experience	1.21	1.10	1.00	0.90		
Programming language experience	1.14	1.07	1.00	0.95		
Project attributes
Application of software engineering methods	1.24	1.10	1.00	0.91	0.82	
Use of software tools	1.24	1.10	1.00	0.91	0.83	
Required development schedule	1.23	1.08	1.00	1.04	1.10	

The Intermediate Cocomo formula now takes the form:

E = a(KSLOC)^{b}(EAF)

where E is the effort applied in person-months, KSLOC is the estimated number of thousands of source lines of code delivered for the project, and EAF is the factor calculated above. The coefficient a and the exponent b are given in the next table for different project types.

Software project	a	b	c
Organic	3.2	1.05	0.38
Semi-detached	3.0	1.12	0.35
Embedded	2.8	1.20	0.32

The Development time D and also the most effective number of Persons P calculation uses E in the same way as in the Basic COCOMO:

D = 2.5 E^{c}
$P = E/D$

Note that in addition to the EAF, the parameter a is different in Intermediate COCOMO from the Basic model:

Software project	a
Organic	2.4
Semi-detached	3.0
Embedded	3.6

The parameters b and c are the same in both models.

== See also ==
- Comparison of development estimation software
- Cost overrun
- COSYSMO
- Estimation in software engineering
- Function point
- Object point
- Putnam model
- SEER-SEM
- Software development effort estimation
- Software engineering economics
- PRICE Systems
