= USC Viterbi School of Engineering =

University of Southern California engineering school

- Type: Private
- Established: 1905
- Parent institution: University of Southern California
- Dean: Yannis C. Yortsos
- Faculty: 188
- Undergraduates: 2700
- Postgraduates: 5900
- Location: Los Angeles, California, United States; 34°1′12″N 118°17′20″W
- Campus: Urban
- Website: viterbischool.usc.edu

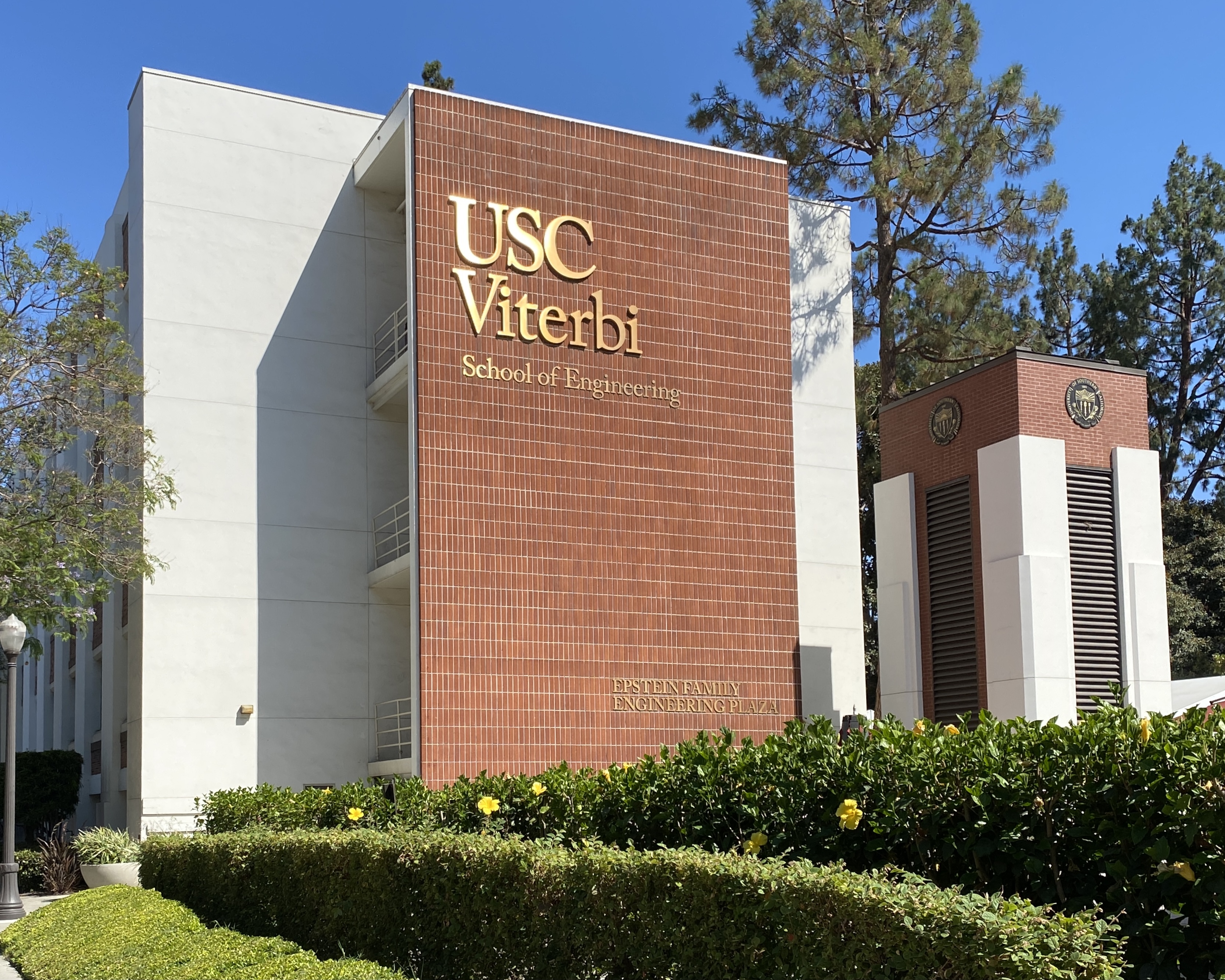
Biegler Hall, USC Viterbi School of Engineering

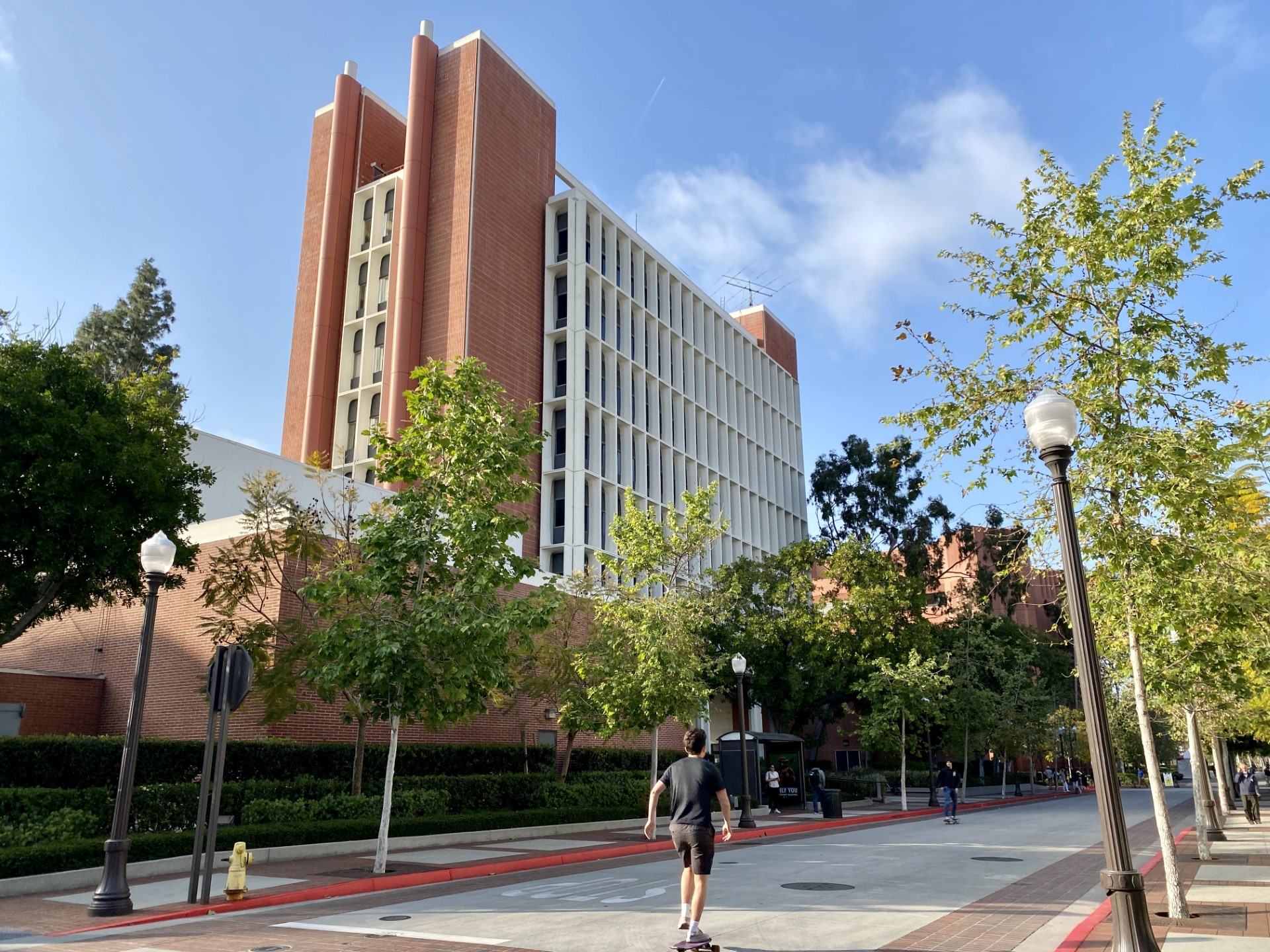
Main academic complex at the USC Viterbi School of Engineering

The USC Viterbi School of Engineering (formerly the USC School of Engineering) is the engineering school of the University of Southern California. It was renamed following a $52 million donation by Andrew J. Viterbi, co-founder of Qualcomm.

The school is currently headed by interim Dean Gaurav Sukhatme, succeeding Yannis C. Yortsos, who served as dean for 21 years. Its research centers have played a major role in development of multiple technologies, including early development of the Internet when USC researcher Jonathan Postel was an editor of communications-protocol for the fledgling network, also known as ARPANET. The school's faculty has included Irving Reed, Leonard Adleman, Solomon W. Golomb, Barry Boehm, Clifford Newman, Richard E. Bellman, Lloyd Welch, Alexander Sawchuk, Maja Matarić, Iraj Ershaghi, and George V. Chilingar.

== Major research centers ==
- Alfred Mann Institute — business incubator for medical device development in preparation for commercialization
- Center for Biomimetic Microelectronic Systems — National Science Foundation Engineering Research Center
- Center for Risk and Economic Analysis of Terrorism Events (CREATE) — interdisciplinary national research center funded by the U.S. Department of Homeland Security
- Center for Systems and Software Engineering (CSSE) — research the relationship between systems, software, and users.
- Information Sciences Institute (housed at separate facilities in Marina del Rey, California and Arlington, Virginia) — played a major role in the development of the Internet, and continues to be a major research center in computer science
- Institute for Creative Technologies — conducts research in virtual reality and immersive digital environment
- Integrated Media Systems Center — National Science Foundation's Exclusive Engineering Research Center for multimedia and Internet research
- Pacific Earthquake Engineering Research Center (PEER) Partner Institution — Current Research
- USC + Amazon Center on Secure & Trusted Machine Learning
- USC ECE-ISE Meta Center for Research and Education in AI and Learning — center to advance AI research and increase accessibility in AI education
- USC-Lockheed Martin Quantum Computing Center — conducts research in quantum computing

== Specific contributions ==
- AFL Theory — created by Prof. Seymour Ginsburg
- ART image file format — developed by Prof. Irving Reed
- Baum–Welch algorithm — developed by Prof. Lloyd Welch in collaboration with Leonard E. Baum
- CMOS image sensor — invented by Prof. Eric Fossum
- COCOMO — developed by Prof. Barry Boehm
- Contour crafting — under development by Behrokh Khoshnevis of ISI
- DNA computing — invented by Prof. Leonard Adleman
- Domain Name System (DNS) — developed by Paul Mockapetris and the late Jon Postel at ISI
- Dynamic programming — developed by Prof. Richard Bellman
- Golomb coding — entropy encoding invented by Prof. Solomon W. Golomb that is optimal for alphabets following geometric distributions
- ICANN — founded by Jon Postel, to ensure the stable and secure operation of the Internet's unique identifier systems
- Image compression & recognition — the work of William Pratt, Harry Andrews and subsequently Andrew G. Tescher led to today's JPEG compression system for still images
- Kerberos — security protocol developed by B.Clifford Neuman.
- Lenna — widely used standard test image in image processing experiments
- LOOM — knowledge representation language developed by researchers in the AI research group at ISI
- MBASE — software development process developed by Prof. Barry Boehm and Dan Port
- MOSIS — integrated circuit (IC) foundry service run by ISI
- Network Voice Protocol (NVP) — first implemented in 1973 by Internet researcher Danny Cohen of ISI
- Pseudorandom sequences/shift register sequences — in 1967, Prof. Solomon Golomb published the first book devoted exclusively to pseudorandom sequences
- Reed-Solomon code — invented in 1960 by Prof. Irving S. Reed and Gustave Solomon
- Viterbi algorithm — invented by Andrew Viterbi
- .us — the ccTLD for the United States, originally administrated by Jon Postel of ISI
- 10.2 — surround sound format developed by Prof. Tomlinson Holman (creator of THX) and Prof. Chris Kyriakakis

== Student organizations ==
=== AeroDesign Team of USC ===
The AeroDesign Team (ADT) is a student-led design team within the Department of Aerospace and Mechanical Engineering. Founded in 1991, ADT's purpose is to help students gain industry-like experience by competing in early design competitions that simulate typical design cycles in the Aerospace field. The team started out competing in the SAE AeroDesign contest but then switched its participation to the AIAA Design/Build/Fly (DBF) contest in 1997. The DBF contest has rules that change yearly, requiring students to come up with a completely new design each year. ADT won the DBF contest in 1998, 2009, 2014, and 2017. This is the second most first-place finish ever out of the 100+ universities from around the world that participate yearly.

=== Associated Students of Biomedical Engineering ===
Among the many organizations on campus, the Associated Students of Biomedical Engineering (ASBME) is an undergraduate student organization for biomedical engineering students at the USC Viterbi School of Engineering. ASBME is a student-run undergraduate and graduate biomedical engineering organization at USC that serves the engineering student body through academic, social, and corporate events. Students gain clarity in their chosen field of study and the opportunities that being a BME major brings. Students are also able to get a foot in the corporate door at the annual ASBME corporate dinner, attended by USC alumni as well as other corporate representatives.

Activities consist of regular meetings with guest speakers and panels, the BIOMED Research Symposium, the annual Corporate Dinner and Networking Nights designed to foster relationships between graduating students and industry, and many other social, community, and corporate events.

ASBME serves as USC's chapter of the Biomedical Engineering Society (BMES) and sends some of its students to the annual BMES Conference each year.

=== Pi Tau Sigma (Tau Beta chapter) ===
Pi Tau Sigma is an international mechanical engineering honor society that strives to "create better engineers through a commitment to academic excellence and dedication to service." The USC Tau Beta chapter is composed of the top mechanical engineers at the University of Southern California. USC's Pi Tau Sigma engages in social, industry and community service-related events in the USC neighborhood and beyond. Paul Ronney serves as an advisor for the USC chapter of Pi Tau Sigma.

=== USC Association for the Advancement of Artificial Intelligence ===
USC has a student chapter of Association for the Advancement of Artificial Intelligence. AAAI organizes speaker events and information sessions in the field of Artificial Intelligence to increase students' interest in AI.

=== USC Rocket Propulsion Lab (USCRPL) ===
USCRPL was founded in 2005 with the goal of putting a student-designed and -built rocket into space.

In 2019, USCRPL became the world’s first student organization to successfully launch and recover an entirely student-designed and student-fabricated rocket (Traveler IV) past the Karman line with a confidence of 90%.

The group holds records for the most powerful solid motor in student rocketry and the most powerful composite-case motor in amateur rocketry with their Shockwave mission, as well as records for the highest altitude achieved in student and amateur rocketry and the fastest velocity achieved in student and amateur rocketry with their Aftershock II mission.

=== Viterbi Graduate Students Association (VGSA) ===
The Viterbi Graduate Students Association (VGSA) is the student government for the graduate students of the Viterbi School. It consists of representatives from all departments and several student organizations, as well as the Viterbi Graduate Student Liaison (VGSL).

== Notable alumni ==
- Gary Dean Anderson, graphic designer and architect, best known for designing the recycling symbol.
- Neil Armstrong, American astronaut and aeronautical engineer who was the first person to walk on the Moon.
- Wanda Austin, former president and CEO of The Aerospace Corporation and former interim president of USC.
- Karol J. Bobko, American aerospace engineer, retired United States Air Force officer, and a former USAF and NASA astronaut.
- Charles Bolden, former administrator of NASA, a retired United States Marine Corps Major General, and a former astronaut who flew on four Space Shuttle missions.
- Colin Brady, American animator and film director with notable film credits, including Toy Story, Toy Story 2, and A Bug’s Life.
- Yvonne Brill, inventor of the electrothermal hydrazine thruster.
- James L. Buie, inventor of transistor–transistor logic.
- Gerald Carr, American mechanical and aeronautical engineer, United States Marine Corps officer, naval aviator, and NASA astronaut.
- Frederick B. Cohen, American computer scientist best known for his pioneering work on computer viruses.
- Nancy J. Currie-Gregg, engineer, United States Army officer and NASA astronaut.
- William H. Dana, American aeronautical engineer, U.S. Air Force pilot, NASA test pilot, and astronaut.
- Brian Duffy, retired U.S. Air Force colonel and a former NASA astronaut.
- Tim Ellis, co-founder and CEO of Relativity Space.
- Mica Endsley, engineer and former Chief Scientist of the United States Air Force.
- Andrew A. Frank, professor of Mechanical and Aeronautical Engineering at University of California, Davis (UC Davis) who is recognized as the father of modern plug-in hybrid electric vehicles.
- Emil Freed, political activist and founder of the Southern California Library for Social Studies and Research.
- Alice Gast, the 16th president of Imperial College London.
- James Grant, American painter, and sculptor best known for his sculptural work in plastics.
- Michael D. Griffin, American physicist, aerospace engineer, and former administrator of NASA who served as the Under Secretary of Defense for Research and Engineering from 2018 to 2020.
- Joseph Gutheinz, American attorney, college instructor, commissioner, writer, and former Army intelligence officer, Army aviator, and Federal law enforcement officer who is known as the founder of the "Moon Rock Project" which aims to track down missing Apollo Moon rock samples.
- John C. Herbst, American flying ace of World War II.
- Payam Heydari, an Iranian-American Professor who is noted for his contribution to the field of radio-frequency and millimeter-wave integrated circuits.
- James Hong, American actor, voice actor, producer, and director.
- Ayanna MacCalla Howard, American roboticist, entrepreneur, and the current dean of the Ohio State University College of Engineering.
- Ming Hsieh, Chinese-born American entrepreneur and philanthropist.
- Grant Imahara, American electrical engineer, roboticist, television host, and actor who was best known for his work on the television series MythBusters.
- Kuntal Joisher, mountaineer known for being the first to climb Mt. Everest from the south side on a completely plant-based diet.
- Nan Marie Jokerst, American professor of Electrical and Computer Engineering at Duke University.
- Abdurrahim El-Keib, Libyan politician, professor of electrical engineering, and entrepreneur who served as interim Prime Minister of Libya from 2011 to 2012.
- Jay Kim, Korean-American politician and former member of the United States House of Representatives from California and ambassador for Korean-American relations who was the first Korean American to be elected to the United States Congress.
- Desmond Koh, a former competitive swimmer from Singapore.
- Ahmed Al-Kudmani, Saudi Arabian former swimmer, two-time Olympian, and a multiple-time medalist at the Pan-Arab Games.
- M. Anthony Lewis, robotics researcher who currently serves as the Vice President of Hewlett-Packard and the head of Hewlett-Packard's Compute Lab for disruptive edge technologies.
- Nathan J. Lindsay, retired Major General in the United States Air Force and former astronaut.
- Jerry M. Linenger, retired Captain in the United States Navy Medical Corps, and a former NASA astronaut who flew on the Space Shuttle and Space Station Mir.
- J. Wayne Littles, eighth director of the NASA Marshall Space Flight Center.
- Armas Clifford "Mike" Markkula Jr., American electrical engineer, businessman, and investor who served as the second CEO of Apple Computer, Inc.
- Chris Mattmann, co-creator of Apache Tika.
- Mohamed Morsi, Egyptian politician and engineer who served as the fifth President of Egypt from 2012 to 2013.
- Firouz Naderi, an Iranian American scientist who spent 36 years in various technical and executive positions at NASA's Jet Propulsion Laboratory (JPL) where he contributed to some of America's most iconic robotic space missions.
- Paul Nakasone, the 3rd commander of United States Cyber Command
- Jordan Noone, co-Founder and founding CTO of Relativity Space.
- Sue C. Payton, worked as the United States Assistant Secretary of the Air Force from 2006 to 2010.
- Boris Podolsky, Russian-American physicist noted for his work with Albert Einstein and Nathan Rosen on entangled wave functions and the EPR paradox.
- Debra L. Reed, first female CEO of Sempra Energy
- Thomas C. Reed, served as the 11th United States Secretary of the Air Force from 1976 to 1977 under Gerald Ford and Jimmy Carter.
- Kenneth S. Reightler Jr., former NASA astronaut.
- Mark Rober, American YouTuber, inventor, engineering, and educator.
- Norman Schwarzkopf Jr., United States Army general who led forces in the Gulf War while serving as the commander of United States Central Command.
- Neil Siegel, an American computer scientist, systems engineer, and USC professor who received the National Medal of Technology and Innovation in 2023.
- William Wang, founder and CEO of Vizio.
- Paul R. Williams, an American architect who designed the homes of numerous celebrities, including Frank Sinatra and Lucille Ball along with many other public and private buildings.

== Historic accomplishments ==
In 1970, Neil Armstrong, who was the first person to set foot on the Moon, during the 1969 NASA Apollo 11 mission, graduated USC with a master of science degree in aerospace engineering.

Equipped with the ability to adapt to arbitrary shapes without any external control, pioneering roboticist George A. Bekey co-created the world’s first five-fingered robot in 1977 — the first able to give a true handshake.

In 1983, the Internet's pivotal Domain Name System (DNS) was invented by ISI researcher Paul Mockapetris. The DNS works as a phone book directory for the Internet, automatically translating text addresses, which humans can understand and remember, to numerical addresses that computers can understand.

== Fundraising ==
Previously known as the USC School of Engineering, it was renamed on March 2, 2004, as the Andrew and Erna Viterbi School of Engineering in honor of Qualcomm co-founder Andrew Viterbi and his wife Erna, who had donated $52 million to the school. The Viterbi School received other major gifts, including gifts from Silicon Valley venture capitalist Mark Stevens who created the USC Stevens Institute for Innovation in 2004; real estate developer Daniel J. Epstein who named the Epstein Department of Industrial and Systems Engineering with an $11 million gift in 2002; Energy Corporation of America CEO John Mork who named the Mork Family Department of Chemical Engineering and Materials Science with a $15 million gift in 2005; Ken Klein, CEO and president of Wind River Systems, who established the Klein Institute for Undergraduate Engineering Life with an $11 million gift, also in 2005; Ming Hsieh, founder of Cogent Systems, who named the Ming Hsieh Department of Electrical Engineering in 2006 with a $35 million gift; and Los Angeles real estate developer Sonny Astani, who named the Sonny Astani Department of Civil and Environmental Engineering with a $17 million gift in 2007.

== See also ==
- Engineering
- Glossary of engineering
- Artificial intelligence
- Glossary of artificial intelligence
- Historical Accomplishments
