= Karen Nelson =

Karen Nelson may refer to:

- Karen E. Nelson, Jamaican-born American microbiologist
- Karen Nelson (athlete), Canadian hurdler
- Karen Nelson (dancer), American dancer, improviser.
