= Yuriy Brun =

American computer scientist and academic

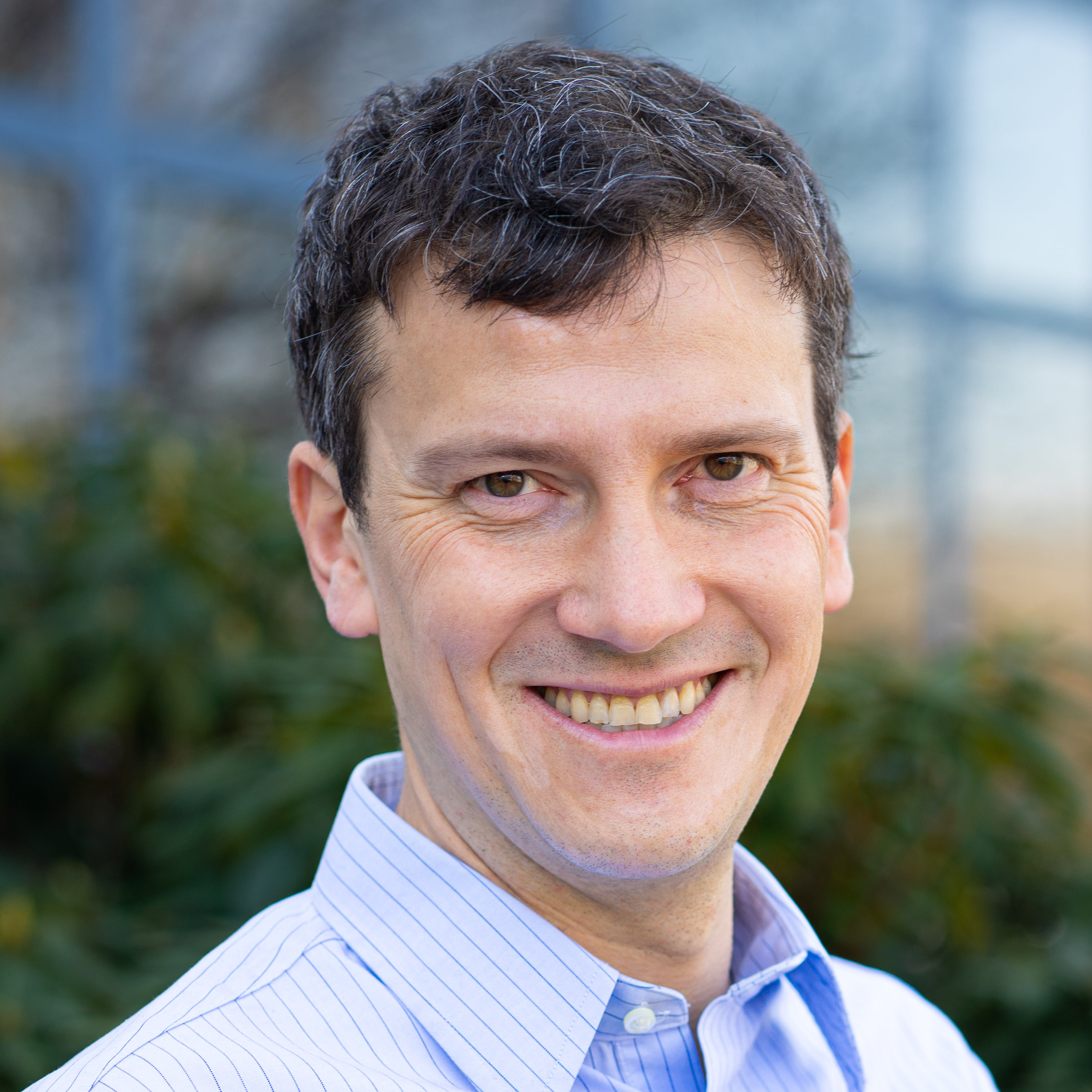
- Citizenship: American
- Education: Massachusetts Institute of Technology (BS, MEng); University of Southern California (MS, PhD)
- Known for: Software fairness testing Automated program repair Automated formal verification
- Awards: IEEE Fellow (2025); ACM Distinguished Member (2019)
- Scientific career
- Fields: Software Engineering; Computer Science
- Workplaces: University of Massachusetts Amherst
- Thesis: Self-assembly for discreet, fault-tolerant, and scalable computation on Internet-sized distributed networks (2008)
- Doctoral advisor: Nenad Medvidović
- Website: people.cs.umass.edu/~brun

Yuriy Brun is an American computer scientist and Professor in the Manning College of Information and Computer Sciences at the University of Massachusetts Amherst. His research focuses on software engineering, including software fairness, automated program repair, and formal verification. He was elevated to IEEE Fellow in 2025 and is a Distinguished Member of the ACM.

== Education ==
Brun received a Bachelor of Science in Computer Science and Engineering, a Bachelor of Science in Mathematics, and a Master of Engineering in Electrical Engineering and Computer Science, all from the Massachusetts Institute of Technology in 2003. He earned a Master of Science in Computer Science in 2006 and a Doctor of Philosophy in Computer Science in 2008, both from the University of Southern California, where his doctoral advisor was Nenad Medvidović. His dissertation was titled "Self-assembly for discreet, fault-tolerant, and scalable computation on Internet-sized distributed networks."

== Career ==
After completing his doctorate, Brun held a Computing Innovation Fellowship at the University of Washington from 2009 to 2012, working with Professor David Notkin. He joined the University of Massachusetts Amherst as a faculty member in 2012 and currently holds the rank of Professor. He co-directs the Laboratory for Advanced Software Engineering Research (LASER) and the PLASMA laboratory.

Brun serves as Associate Editor-in-Chief of IEEE Transactions on Software Engineering (TSE).

== Research ==
=== Software fairness ===
Brun's research contributed to establishing software fairness—the study of discriminatory behavior in software systems—as a subfield of software engineering. His 2017 paper "Fairness Testing: Testing Software for Discrimination," co-authored with Alexandra Meliou, introduced Themis, an automated tool for detecting discriminatory outputs in software, and received the ACM SIGSOFT Distinguished Paper Award at ESEC/FSE 2017. The IEEE Computer Society's Technical Council on Software Engineering awarded Brun the TCSE New Directions Award in 2021, citing his contribution "for the establishment of a new research direction in the area of software fairness testing." The fairness research has been covered by Bloomberg, Fast Company, and ACM TechNews.

For this work, Brun received the Google Inclusion Research Award in 2021 and a Meta Research Award in 2021 (with Philip Thomas).

=== Automated program repair ===
Brun's work on speculative analysis—a technique that helps software developers anticipate and resolve conflicts before they arise during collaborative development—was identified in a 2015 survey of software engineering practitioners as the most industrially relevant research published in the preceding five years, among 571 papers examined. His paper "Continuous Analysis of Collaborative Design," published at the 2017 IEEE International Conference on Software Architecture (ICSA), received the Best Paper Award. His earlier paper "An Architectural Style for Solving Computationally Intensive Problems on Large Networks," co-authored with Nenad Medvidović, received the ACM/IEEE SEAMS Most Influential Paper Award in 2020.

Brun also contributed to the study of overfitting in automated program repair. His 2015 paper "Is the Cure Worse Than the Disease? Overfitting in Automated Program Repair" introduced methods for quantifying the degree to which automatically generated software patches fail to generalize beyond the test suite used to produce them. The paper received the ACM FSE Test of Time Honorable Mention Award in 2025.

=== Automated formal verification ===
Brun has contributed to automating formal verification—the mathematical proof of software correctness—using machine learning. His 2023 paper "Baldur: Whole-Proof Generation and Repair with Large Language Models" was the first to demonstrate that a Large Language Model (LLM) can generate and repair entire proofs of software properties at once, and received the ACM SIGSOFT Distinguished Paper Award at ESEC/FSE 2023. His 2020 paper "TacTok: Semantics-Aware Proof Synthesis" demonstrated that Machine Learning can guide a search procedure to generate software verification proofs. His 2025 paper "Rango: Adaptive Retrieval-Augmented Proving for Automated Software Verification" received the ACM SIGSOFT Distinguished Paper Award at ICSE 2025.

== Awards and honors ==
Year	Award
2025	IEEE Fellow
2025	ACM FSE Test of Time Honorable Mention Award
2025	ACM SIGSOFT Distinguished Paper Award, ICSE 2025
2023	ACM SIGSOFT Distinguished Paper Award, ESEC/FSE 2023
2022	ACM SIGSOFT Distinguished Paper Award, ICSE 2022
2021	IEEE Computer Society TCSE New Directions Award
2021	Google Inclusion Research Award
2021	Amazon Research Award
2021	Meta Research Award (with Philip Thomas)
2020	ACM/IEEE SEAMS Most Influential Paper Award
2020	ACM SIGSOFT Distinguished Artifact Award, ICSE 2020
2019	ACM SIGPLAN Distinguished Paper Award, OOPSLA 2020
2019	ACM Distinguished Member
2017	ACM SIGSOFT Distinguished Paper Award, ESEC/FSE 2017
2017	IEEE ICSA Best Paper Award
2017	Lilly Fellowship for Teaching Excellence
2017	UMass Amherst College of Information and Computer Science Outstanding Teacher Award
2015	National Science Foundation CAREER Award
2015	Google Faculty Research Award
2014	Microsoft Research Software Engineering Innovation Foundation Award
2013	IEEE TCSC Young Achiever in Scalable Computing Award
2011	ACM SIGSOFT Distinguished Paper Award, ESEC/FSE 2011
