= PNAS Nexus =

Scientific journal

- Discipline: Multidisciplinary science
- Language: English
- Edited by: Yannis C. Yortsos

Publication details
- History: 2022–present
- Publisher: Oxford University Press on behalf of the National Academy of Sciences (United States)
- Frequency: Monthly
- Open access: Yes
- Impact factor: 3.8 (2024)

Standard abbreviations
- ISO 4: PNAS Nexus

Indexing
- CODEN: PNASGC
- ISSN: 2752-6542
- OCLC no.: 1308472020

Links
- Journal homepage

PNAS Nexus is a peer-reviewed open-access scientific journal published by the National Academy of Sciences in partnership with Oxford University Press. PNAS Nexus was announced in 2021 as a new open-access journal of the National Academy of Sciences. The journal was formally launched in 2022 and publishes multidisciplinary research spanning the biological, physical, and social sciences, as well as engineering and medicine. The journal’s editorial board includes members of the National Academy of Sciences, the National Academy of Engineering, and the National Academy of Medicine, reflecting its interdisciplinary scope.

The journal is a companion to the Proceedings of the National Academy of Sciences (PNAS) and emphasizes interdisciplinary and convergence research across multiple domains.

The inaugural editor-in-chief was Karen E. Nelson, who was succeeded in 2022 by Yannis C. Yortsos.

By 2025, the journal had received approximately 5,000 submissions and published more than 1,600 articles.

== See also ==
- Proceedings of the National Academy of Sciences
