= Raymond Madachy =

- Madachy In front of the American flag.
- Born: Raymond Joseph Madachy
- Occupation: Professor at Naval Postgraduate School

Raymond Joseph Madachy is an American professor of systems engineering at the Naval Postgraduate School. In 2016 he received a Lifetime Achievement Award from the University of Southern California (USC) Center for Systems and Software Engineering. In 2025 he received the Jeff Grady Award for Advancing Systems Engineering Knowledge from the International Council on Systems Engineering (INCOSE) San Diego Chapter for contributions to systems engineering education and research.

== Education ==
Madachy received a bachelor's in mechanical engineering from the University of Dayton in 1981, a master's in system science from the University of California, San Diego in 1983, and a PhD in industrial and systems engineering from USC in 1994.

== Career ==
After working in private industry Madachy worked as a research assistant professor and research scientist at USC from 2005 through 2008. In 2008 he became an associate professor at the Naval Postgraduate School and in 2018 a professor.

=== Recognition ===
- 2017 - Best Paper, IEEE Empirical Software Engineering and Measurement (ESEM) conference
- 2016 - USC CSSE Lifetime Achievement Award, University of Southern California Center for Systems and Software Engineering
- 2015 - Best Paper: Software Estimating Track, International Cost Estimating and Analysis Association

== Selected publications ==
- What Every Engineer Should Know About Modeling and Simulation. Dan X. Houston. London. 2017. ISBN 978-1-315-15260-8. OCLC 1003972062.
- Software Process Dynamics. John Wiley & Sons. 2007. ISBN 978-0-470-19270-2.
- "Software process simulation modeling: Why? What? How?". Journal of Systems and Software. 46 (2): 91–105. 1999-04-15. doi:10.1016/S0164-1212(99)00003-5. ISSN 0164-1212. (with Marc Kellner and David Raffo)
- "Using the WinWin spiral model: a case study". Computer. 31 (7): 33–44. 1998. doi:10.1109/2.689675. (With Boehm, Egyed, Kwan, Port, Shah)
