= Debra L. Reed =

American business executive

- Born: 1957 (age 68–69); Southern California, U.S.
- Education: USC Viterbi School of Engineering
- Occupation: Businesswoman
- Known for: Former chief executive officer of Sempra Energy

Debra L. Reed (born 1957) is an American businesswoman who was the CEO of Sempra Energy from 2011 until her retirement in 2018. She was the first female CEO of Sempra Energy, a Fortune 500 energy services holding company based in San Diego, California.

== Early life and education ==
Reed was born and raised in Southern California.

In 1978, Reed earned her BS in Civil Engineering (summa cum laude) from the University of Southern California. In 1986, she received her license for Engineer in Training.

== Career ==
Reed was chairman of Sempra Energy from 2012 to 2018 and chief executive officer from 2011 to 2018. She was promoted from her previous role as executive vice president at the firm. Before moving into the management of Sempra Energy, Reed was chief financial officer and thereafter (2006 to 2010) President and CEO of two Sempra subsidiaries, San Diego Gas & Electric and Southern California Gas Co (SoCalGas). She retired in 2018 and was replaced by Jeffrey Martin.

In her role at Sempra, Reed presided over $37bn in assets, operated revenues of $10+bn and 17,000 employees. Reed started at SoCalGas in 1978. Her total compensation for 2013, $9,792,288 and her stock ownership for 2014, 57,762.

In 1988, Reed became SoCalGas’s first female officer. She was one of few female 500 CEOs from the Fortune 500 companies.

== Business awards ==
In 2014, Reed was appointed by the U.S. Secretary of Energy to the National Petroleum Council. Fortune Magazine has named her to its list of "Most Powerful Women in Business" six consecutive times, ranking her #23 in 2015 and #22 in 2016.

In 2025, Wall Street Journal named her #3 on their list of "Most Influential Directors."

== Board memberships ==
Reed is a member of the board of directors of Halliburton Co., the Board of Councilors of the University of Southern California Viterbi School of Engineering, Chairman’s Competitiveness Council, The Trusteeship and The Business Council.

In the past, Reed was chairman of the San Diego Regional Economic Development Corporation, a member of the board of directors of Genentech and Avery Dennison Corp.

On April 8, 2015, Caterpillar Inc. announced that Reed had been nominated to join the board of directors, with election to be held at the June 2015 annual stockholders meeting.

== Personal life ==
Reed lives with her husband and daughter in San Diego.
