= Chris Mattmann =

American data scientist

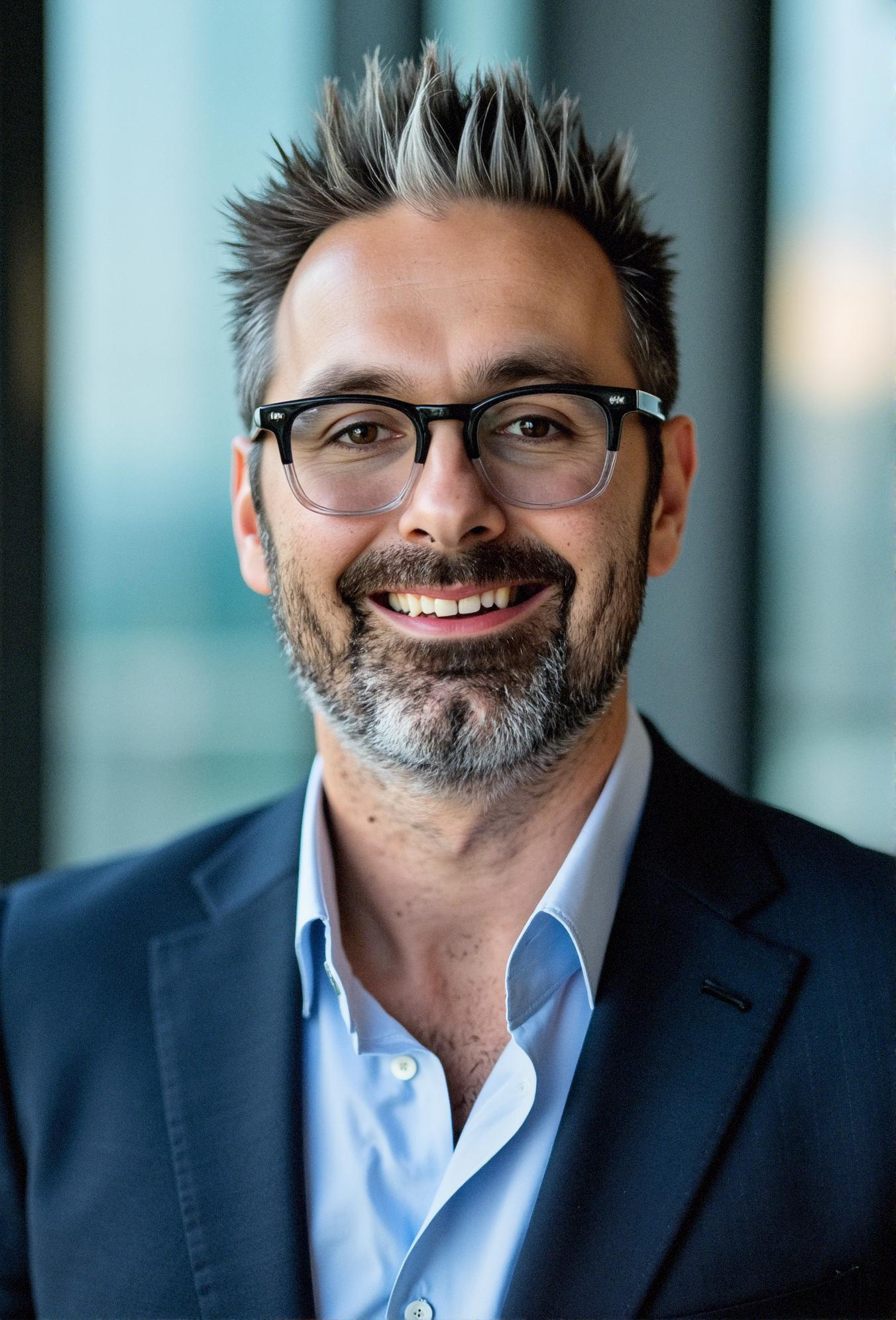
- Born: October 29, 1980 (age 45); Santa Clarita, California, U.S.
- Education: Ph.D. University of Southern California, Los Angeles, 2007
- Organization(s): University of California, Los Angeles, NASA Jet Propulsion Laboratory, University of Southern California, 211 LA County, and Apache Software Foundation
- Known for: Apache Tika, Apache Nutch, Deep web, Object Oriented Data Technology
- Title: Chief Data and Artificial Intelligence Officer at UCLA (2024-present); Director: Apache Software Foundation; Chief Research Officer: 211 LA County
- Website: http://mattmann.ai/

Chris Mattmann (born October 29, 1980) is an American data scientist and artificial intelligence researcher. He serves as the Chief Data and Artificial Intelligence Officer at the University of California, Los Angeles (UCLA), the first such position in the University of California system. He co-invented Apache Tika, a widely used open-source content analysis framework that was instrumental in the Panama Papers investigation, which won the 2017 Pulitzer Prize for Explanatory Reporting. Previously, Mattmann spent 24 years at NASA's Jet Propulsion Laboratory (JPL), where his final roles included Chief Technology and Innovation Officer and Division Manager of the Artificial Intelligence, Analytics and Innovative Development Organization.

== Early career and education ==
Mattmann received his B.S. and Ph.D. in Computer Science from the University of Southern California (USC), completing his doctorate in 2007 under the supervision of Nenad Medvidović. While at USC, he co-invented Apache Tika with Jérôme Charron, a software framework for content detection and analysis. He later co-authored Tika in Action with Jukka Zitting, published by Manning Publications in 2011. Mattmann subsequently maintained a long-standing affiliation with USC as an adjunct faculty member at the USC Viterbi School of Engineering, where he directed the Information Retrieval and Data Science (IRDS) Group, a research collective focused on AI, data science, and information retrieval applications.

== NASA Jet Propulsion Laboratory (2001-2024) ==
Mattmann spent 24 years at NASA's Jet Propulsion Laboratory, joining in 2001. He was one of the principal developers of Object Oriented Data Technology (OODT), an open-source data management platform originally developed at JPL. In 2009, Mattmann led the effort to donate OODT to the Apache Software Foundation, where it entered the Apache Incubator in January 2010 and graduated to Top-Level Project status in November 2010, becoming the first NASA-developed software to achieve this distinction. The software was used by NASA for data management across missions including Orbiting Carbon Observatory and Soil Moisture Active Passive, as well as by the National Cancer Institute for cancer research databases.

From 2015 to 2018, Mattmann served as principal investigator for JPL's work on DARPA's Memex program, developing advanced search and indexing technologies for the deep web and dark web. The project extended tools such as Apache Nutch and Apache Tika to handle dynamic web content and multimedia analysis, with applications including tracking illicit activities such as human trafficking.

In 2013, Mattmann published "Computing: A vision for data science" in Nature, which has been credited with helping to define the emerging field of data science. As of 2026, Mattmann's publications have accumulated over 4,000 citations on Google Scholar. His work on data science was featured in Quanta Magazine in two 2013 articles on interdisciplinary big data collaboration and the future of data analysis.

== Apache Software Foundation ==
Mattmann was an early contributor to Apache Nutch, the open-source web crawler that served as a predecessor to the big data platform Apache Hadoop. In March 2010, he became the first NASA employee to be elected a member of the Apache Software Foundation. He was subsequently elected to the ASF Board of Directors in May 2013, serving five consecutive terms until March 2018 in roles including Treasurer, Vice Chairman, and Vice President of the Legal Affairs Committee.

== Panama Papers ==
Apache Tika, which Mattmann co-created, played a central role in the International Consortium of Investigative Journalists' (ICIJ) processing of the 11.5 million leaked documents that comprised the Panama Papers. ICIJ used Tika for document processing and format conversion across the massive dataset, enabling a team of over 300 journalists from 76 countries to search and analyze the files. The investigation won the 2017 Pulitzer Prize for Explanatory Reporting.

== UCLA (2024-present) ==
In June 2024, Mattmann joined UCLA as its inaugural Chief Data and Artificial Intelligence Officer, the first such position in the University of California system. In this role, he chairs the UC Systemwide AI Council Innovation and Impact Sub-Committee and also holds a secondary appointment as Associate Project Scientist at UCLA's Joint Institute for Regional Earth System Science and Engineering (JIFRESSE). In September 2024, Mattmann contributed to UCLA's agreement with OpenAI to introduce ChatGPT Enterprise on campus, making UCLA the first California university to integrate the technology at institutional scale.

== Other roles ==
Since 2008, Mattmann has served as Chief Research Officer at 211 LA County, a nonprofit social services organization, where he applies data science techniques to improve community services and has helped develop the agency's data capabilities.

In 2021, Mattmann was named to the Los Angeles Business Journal's "Leaders of Influence: Thriving in Their 40s" list.

== Publications and media ==
Mattmann is the author or co-author of several books and numerous academic papers. His books include Tika in Action (Manning Publications, 2011), co-authored with Jukka Zitting, and Machine Learning with TensorFlow, Second Edition (Manning Publications, 2021), a practical guide covering neural networks, image recognition, and natural language processing.

In January 2024, he co-authored a guest opinion piece for The New York Times with Jacob N. Shapiro titled "A.I. Is Coming for the Past, Too," addressing the risks of AI-generated deepfakes to historical records.

Mattmann has been interviewed as an expert on AI and cybersecurity by media outlets including CNN, KTLA, and the Daily Bruin.
