= Ming Hsieh =

American businessman

- 謝明
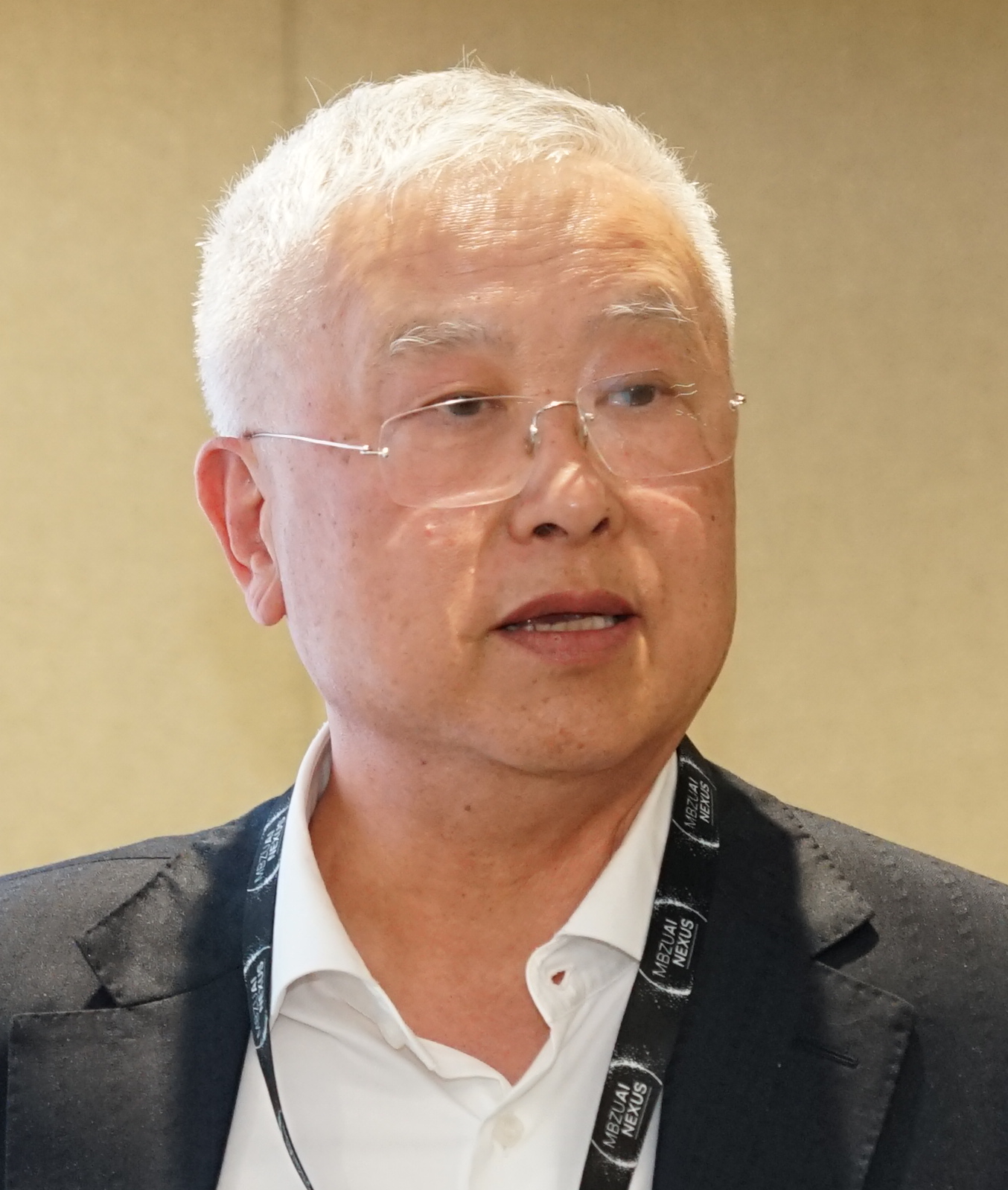
- Hsieh in 2026
- Born: 1956 (age 69–70); Shenyang, Liaoning, China
- Education: University of Southern California, BS, MS
- Known for: Cogent Systems
- Spouse: Eva Hsieh
- Children: 4

Ming Hsieh (traditional Chinese: 謝明; simplified Chinese: 谢明; pinyin: Xiè Míng; Wade–Giles: Hsieh^{4} Ming^{2}; born 1956) is a billionaire Chinese-born American entrepreneur and philanthropist. He founded Cogent Systems in 1990, and sold it to 3M in 2010. In 2011, he founded a genetic testing technology company, Fulgent Genetics.

== Early life and education ==
Ming Hsieh was born in 1956 in Shenyang, the capital city of Liaoning province in Northeast China. His parents were Baoyan and Sun Hsieh.

Because his grandparents lived in Taiwan and his father had also recently lived there, during the Cultural Revolution his family was persecuted as being a part of China's upper middle class and having ties with the Taiwan Nationalist government. As a result, his family was forced to move in 1970 to a small country village near Panjin. Hsieh's formal education was therefore stopped for several years. He was home-schooled by his parents, and learned the trade of electrical engineering from his formally trained father as they built a crude power system for the unelectrified village and did a variety of repair work.

After the Cultural Revolution ended in late 1976, Hsieh studied semiconductor physics at South China University of Technology for two years.

Hsieh's uncle, P.Y. Hsieh, had left China and earned a Master of Science in electrical engineering from the University of Southern California in 1952, and then worked for TRW. This uncle helped him transfer to USC's engineering program in January 1981. Hsieh earned his Bachelor of Science in electrical engineering from USC in 1983 and his Master of Science in electrical engineering (MSEE) in 1984. His parents wanted him to continue and earn a Ph.D., but Hsieh decided to begin his career instead.

== Career ==
Hsieh began his professional career in 1985 as a circuit designer for International Rectifier.

He co-founded his first company, AMAX Information Technologies, a high performance computing and storage vendor, which specialized in servers, storage systems and related hardware, with several fellow USC graduates in 1987.

In 1990, together with another USC classmate, he co-founded Cogent Systems, which offered fully automated, high-speed biometric fingerprint-identification system and customized software. He was president, chairman, and CEO of the company. The company went public via an IPO in 2004, and by 2007 had numerous government contracts including the Department of Homeland Security, Federal Bureau of Prisons, FBI and Royal Canadian Mounted Police. Cogent was acquired by 3M in 2010.

In 2011, Hsieh founded Fulgent Therapeutics, a genetic testing company, which is now Fulgent Genetics. He took the company public via IPO in 2016. Hsieh is chairman and CEO of the company.

Hsieh was elected a member of the National Academy of Engineering in 2015.

== Philanthropy ==
In October 2006, Hsieh donated $35 million to USC's Viterbi School of Engineering's Department of Electrical Engineering, 100 years after the department and school's founding. In honor of his donation, the department was renamed the USC Ming Hsieh Department of Electrical Engineering. In October 2010, Hsieh donated $50 million to USC for cancer research. He is on the USC Board of Trustees.

In November 2007, Hsieh donated $5.5 million, cash and in-kind, to West Virginia University's Eberly College of Arts and Sciences Department of Forensic Investigative Sciences, one of only ten in the nation. WVU houses the largest Crime Scene Training Complex in the country. In honor of his donation, WVU named a building on their downtown campus, Ming Hsieh Hall.

In February 2014, he donated $1 million to the Children's Hospital Los Angeles.

== Personal life ==
Hsieh is a naturalized U.S. citizen. He is married to Eva Hsieh; they reside in Pasadena and have two children. Hsieh also has two adult children from a previous marriage.
