= Barry Boehm =

American software engineer (1935–2022)

Barry W. Boehm
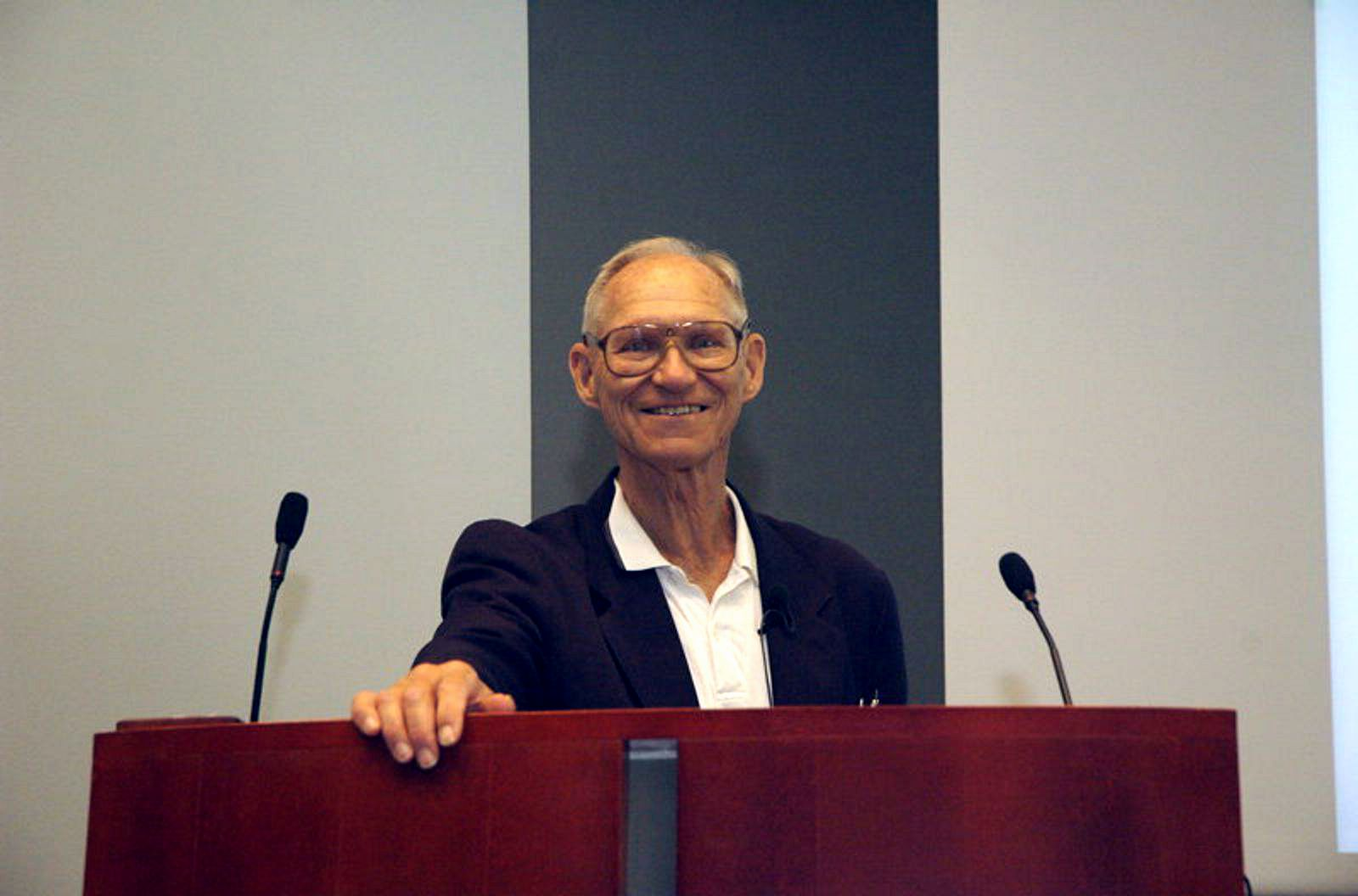
- Born: May 16, 1935; Santa Monica, California, US
- Died: August 20, 2022 (aged 87); Santa Monica, California, US

Academic background
- Education: Harvard University; UCLA
- Thesis: Existence, characterization, and convergence of best rational Tchebycheff approximations. (1964)
- Doctoral advisor: Elliott Ward Cheney Jr.

Academic work
- Institutions: General Dynamics; RAND Corporation; TRW Inc. University of Southern California

Barry William Boehm (May 16, 1935 – August 20, 2022) was an American software engineer, distinguished professor of computer science, industrial and systems engineering; the TRW Professor of Software Engineering; and founding director of the Center for Systems and Software Engineering at the University of Southern California. He was known for his many contributions to the area of software engineering.

In 1996, Boehm was elected as a member into the National Academy of Engineering for contributions to computer and software architectures and to models of cost, quality, and risk for aerospace systems.

== Biography ==
Boehm was born on May 16, 1935. He received a BA in mathematics from Harvard University in 1957, and an MS in 1961, and PhD from UCLA in 1964, both in mathematics as well. His PhD advisor was Elliott Ward Cheney Jr.. He also received honorary Sc.D. in Computer Science from the University of Massachusetts in 2000 and in Software Engineering from the Chinese Academy of Sciences in 2011.

In 1955 he started working as a programmer-analyst at General Dynamics. In 1959 he switched to the RAND Corporation, where he was head of the Information Sciences Department until 1973. From 1973 to 1989 he was chief scientist of the Defense Systems Group at TRW Inc. From 1989 to 1992 he served within the U.S. Department of Defense (DoD) as director of the DARPA Information Science and Technology Office, and as director of the DDR&E Software and Computer Technology Office. From 1992 he was TRW Professor of Software Engineering, Computer Science Department, and director, USC Center for Systems and Software Engineering, formerly Center for Software Engineering.

He served on the board of several scientific journals, including the IEEE Transactions on Software Engineering, Computer, IEEE Software, ACM Computing Reviews, Automated Software Engineering, Software Process, and Information and Software Technology.

== Awards ==
Later awards for Boehm included the Office of the Secretary of Defense Award for Excellence in 1992, the ASQC Lifetime Achievement Award in 1994, the ACM Distinguished Research Award in Software Engineering in 1997, and the IEEE International Stevens Award. He was an AIAA Fellow, an ACM Fellow, an IEEE Fellow, and a member of the National Academy of Engineering (1996). He received the Mellon Award for Excellence in Mentoring in 2005 and the IEEE Simon Ramo Medal in 2010. He was appointed a distinguished professor on January 13, 2014.

He was awarded the INCOSE Pioneer Award in 2019 by the International Council on Systems Engineering for significant pioneering contributions to the field of systems engineering.

== Work ==
Boehm's research interests included software development process modeling, software requirements engineering, software architectures, software metrics and cost models, software engineering environments, and knowledge-based software engineering.

His contributions to the field, according to Boehm (1997) himself, include "the Constructive Cost Model (COCOMO), the spiral model of the software process, the Theory W (win-win) approach to software management and requirements determination and two advanced software engineering environments: the TRW Software Productivity System and Quantum Leap Environment".

=== Software versus hardware costs ===
In an important 1973 report entitled "Ada - The Project : The DoD High Order Language Working Group" to the Defense Advanced Research Projects Agency (DARPA), Boehm predicted that software costs would overwhelm hardware costs. DARPA had expected him to predict that hardware would remain the biggest problem, encouraging them to invest in even larger computers. The report inspired a change of direction in computing.

=== Software economics ===
Boehm's 1981 book Software Engineering Economics documents his Constructive Cost Model (COCOMO). It relates software development effort for a program, in Person-Months (PM), to Thousand Source Lines of Code (KSLOC).

$PM = A * (KSLOC)^{B}$

Where A is a calibration constant based on project data and B is an exponent for the software diseconomy of scale.

- Note: since man-years are not interchangeable with years, Brooks' Law applies:
  - Adding programmers to a late project makes it later.
  - Thus this formula is best applied to stable software development teams which have completed multiple projects.

=== Spiral model ===
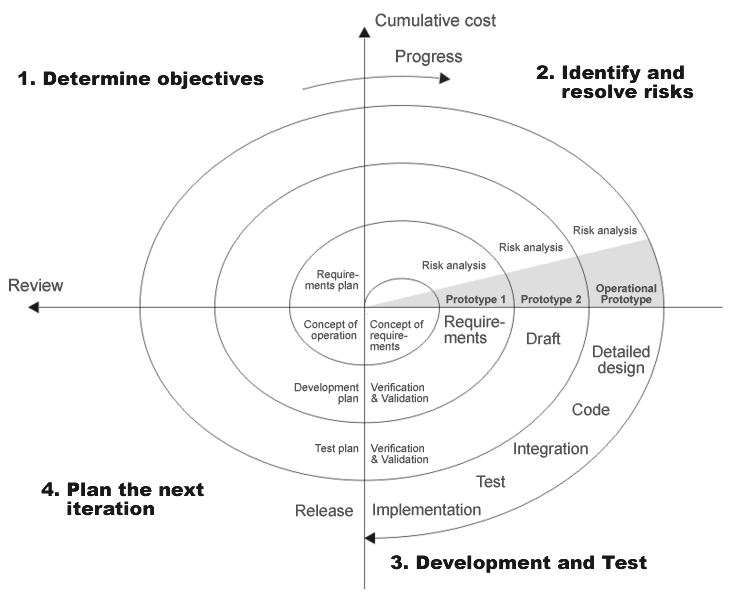
Spiral model (Boehm, 1988).

Boehm also created the spiral model of software development, in which the phases of development are repeatedly revisited. This iterative software development process influenced MBASE and extreme programming.

=== Wideband Delphi ===
Boehm refined the Delphi method of estimation to include more group iteration, making it more suitable for certain classes of problems, such as software development. This variant is called the Wideband Delphi method.

=== Incremental Commitment Model ===
The Incremental Commitment Model (ICM) is a system design, developmental, and evolution process for 21^{st} century systems. The systems' types cover a wide range from COTS based systems to "routine" Information Systems to human intensive and life or safety critical.

Boehm then reconciled the ICM with the WinWin Spiral Model and its incarnation in MBASE and the follow-on Lean MBASE, and worked towards an Incremental Commitment Model for Software (ICMS) by adapting the existing WinWin Spiral Model support tools. In 2008, the evolving ICM for Software with its risk-driven anchor point decisions, proved very useful to several projects which ended up having unusual life cycle phase sequences.

== See also ==
- List of pioneers in computer science

== Publications ==
Boehm published over 170 articles and several books. Books, a selection:

- 1978. Characteristics of Software Quality. With J.R. Brown, H. Kaspar, M. Lipow, G. McLeod, and M. Merritt, North Holland.
- 1981. Software Engineering Economics. Englewood Cliffs, NJ : Prentice-Hall, 1981 ISBN 0-13-822122-7.
- — (1989). "Software Risk Management". In Ghezzi, C.; McDermid, J. A. (eds.). Proceedings of 2nd European Software Engineering Conference. ESEC'89. LNCS. Vol. 387. pp. 1–19. doi:10.1007/3-540-51635-2_29. ISBN 3-540-51635-2. ISSN 0302-9743.
- 1996. Ada and Beyond: Software Policies for the Department of Defense. National Academy Press.
- 2000. Software Cost Estimation with COCOMO II. B. Boehm, C. Abts, A. W. Brown, S. Chulani, B. Clark, E. Horowitz, Madachy, R., D. Reifer, B. Steece. Upper Saddle River, NJ : Prentice-Hall, 2000 ISBN 0-13-026692-2.
- 2007. Software engineering: Barry Boehm's lifetime contributions to software development, management and research. Ed. by Richard Selby. Wiley/IEEE press, 2007. ISBN 0-470-14873-X.
- 2004. Balancing Agility and Discipline: A Guide for the Perplexed. With Richard Turner. Pearson Education, Inc 2004 ISBN 0-321-18612-5.
- 2014. The Incremental Commitment Spiral Model: Principles and Practices for Successful Systems and Software. B. Boehm, J. Lane, S. Koolmanojwong, R. Turner. Addison-Wesley Professional, 2014. ISBN 0-321-80822-3.

Articles

- 1996. "Anchoring the Software Process". In: IEEE Software, July 1996.
- 1997. "Developing Multimedia Applications with the WinWin Spiral Model," with A. Egyed, J. Kwan, and Madachy, R.. In: Proceedings, ESEC/FSE 97 and ACM Software Engineering Notes, November 1997.
