= Nenad Medvidović =

American entrepreneur and software engineer

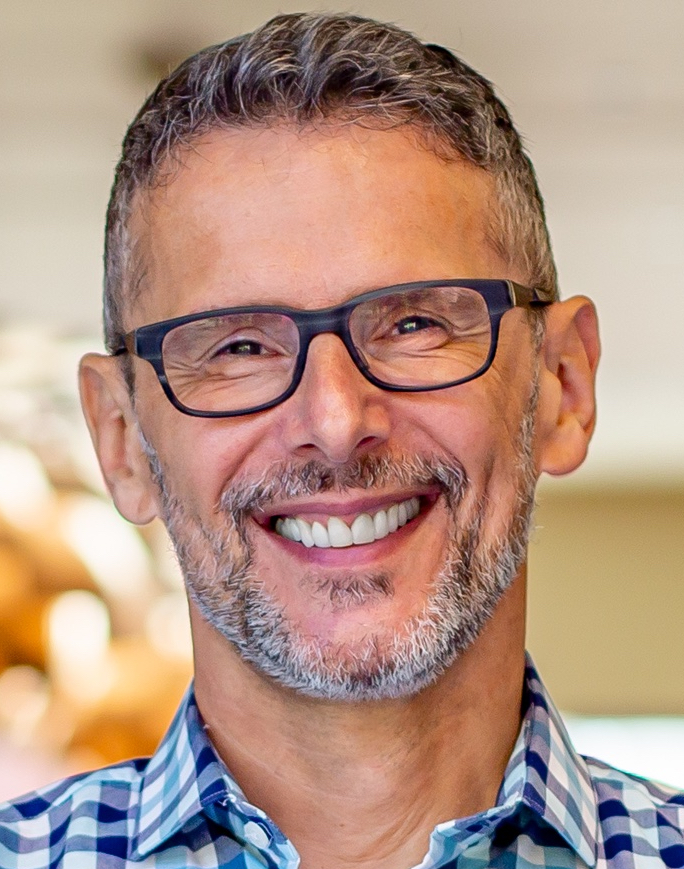
- Citizenship: American
- Awards: IEEE Fellow (2016); ACM Fellow (2025) ACM SIGSOFT Software Engineering Academy (2026) ACM/IEEE ICSE Most Influential Paper (2008); IEEE ICSA Best Paper (2017); IEEE/ACM ASE Best Tool Paper (2017); IEEE ICSA Best Paper (2018); ACM/IEEE SEAMS Most Influential Paper (2020); IEEE TSE Most Influential Paper (2025)
- Scientific career
- Fields: Software Engineering; Computer Science
- Workplaces: University of Southern California
- Doctoral advisor: Richard Taylor
- Doctoral students: Chris Mattmann; Yuriy Brun
- Website: softarch.usc.edu/~neno/

Nenad Medvidović is a computer scientist whose work has focused on software engineering and distributed systems. He is a Professor and Chair of the Thomas Lord Department of Computer Science at the University of Southern California in Los Angeles, CA. He is a Fellow of ACM and IEEE, and a member of the ACM SIGSOFT Software Engineering Academy.

Medvidović served as Chair of ACM SIGSOFT and Editor-in-Chief of IEEE Transactions on Software Engineering (TSE). He received Distinguished Service Awards from ACM SIGSOFT (2020) and IEEE TCSE (2026).

Medvidović co-authored the textbook Software Architecture: Foundations, Theory, and Practice (2009). In 2008, he received the Most Influential Paper Award for a paper titled "Architecture-Based Runtime Software Evolution" published in the 1998 ACM/IEEE International Conference on Software Engineering (ICSE). In 2020, he received the Most Influential Paper Award for a paper titled "An architectural style for solving computationally intensive problems on large networks" published in the 2007 ACM/IEEE International Conference on Software Engineering for Adaptive and Self-Managing Systems (SEAMS). In 2025, his paper titled "A Classification and Comparison Framework for Software Architecture Description Languages", published in 2000 in IEEE TSE, was named a TSE Most Influential Paper. In 2017 and 2018, Medvidović received back-to-back Best Paper Awards from the IEEE International Conference on Software Architecture (ICSA) for his papers titled "Continuous Analysis of Collaborative Design" and ''An Empirical Study of Architectural Decay in Open-Source Software". In 2017, his paper titled "SEALANT: A Detection and Visualization Tool for Inter-app Security Vulnerabilities in Android" received the Best Tool Paper Award at the IEEE/ACM International Conference on Automated Software Engineering (ASE).

Medvidović received a PhD from UC Irvine in 1999.

== Bibliography ==
- Software Architecture: Foundations, Theory, and Practice 2009. Wiley, ISBN 978-0-470-16774-8
