= Alfred E. Mann Institute for Biomedical Engineering =

Former Uni. of Southern Cali. institute

Founded in 1998, Alfred E. Mann Institute for Biomedical Engineering at the University of Southern California (AMI-USC) was a 501c(3) non-profit organization dedicated to biomedical engineering technology development. The institute was located on the University Park Campus of USC in Los Angeles, California and focuses on helping to bridge the gap between discovery research and product commercialization. As of 2022, the institute's financial endowment was $230 million, with over $150 million donated by medical device entrepreneur and philanthropist Alfred E. Mann.

In 2015, a former employee of AMI-USC filed a lawsuit against the institute, USC, and two of AMI-USC's executives. The plaintiff accused the institute of sexual harassment and wrongful termination. The plaintiff was represented by The Bloom Firm, led by attorney Lisa Bloom. The case was settled via arbitration.

In 2022, USC President Dr. Carol Folt announced that most of AMI-USC's endowment will be reallocated to help support medical research and commercialization efforts of other entities within or affiliated with USC. These include the USC School of Pharmacy, USC Viterbi School of Engineering Department of Biomedical Engineering, and Children's Hospital Los Angeles.

In 2023, AMI-USC was effectively dissolved by the USC administration. The institute's operations, management, staff, and volunteer Board of Directors were terminated after prior notification. Control over any remaining financial assets was transferred to USC Research and Innovation (OORI). AMI-USC no longer operates as an independent 501c(3) non-profit organization.
