= Early Detection Research Network =

Cancer biomarker discovery project

The Early Detection Research Network (EDRN) is a collaboration led by the National Cancer Institute (NCI) focused on the discovery of cancer biomarkers. The effort, started in 2000, includes both principal investigators and associate members from leading research institutions across the United States.

The objectives of EDRN include:

- Developing and testing promising biomarkers and technologies to obtain preliminary information to guide further testing;
- Evaluating promising, analytically proven biomarkers and technologies, such as measures of accuracy, sensitivity, specificity and, when possible, as potential predictors of outcomes or surrogate endpoints for clinical trials;
- Analyzing biomarkers and their expression patterns to serve as background for large, definitive validation studies;
- Collaborating with academic and industrial leaders to develop high-throughput, sensitive assay methods;
- Conducting early phases of clinical and epidemiological biomarker studies; and
- Encouraging collaboration and dissemination of information to ensure progress and avoid fragmentation of effort.

Since 2000, EDRN has established a national infrastructure to support validation of cancer biomarkers through innovative research and technology approaches. EDRN supports validation of some of the most promising proteomic and genomic markers evaluating their results for continued research. The biomarkers must be reliable and repeatable in testing; highly sensitive and specific; quantitative; readily obtained by non-invasive methods; part of the causal pathway for disease; capable of being modulated by the chemopreventive agent; and have high predictive value for clinical disease.

The EDRN is organized to perform research around specific organ sites. Research teams within and outside EDRN are established to develop protocols of study around each of these organ sites. Within the EDRN, collaborations are established so researchers involved in specific organs can work together and study results. These organ groups include breast and gynecologic cancers, colorectal and other gastrointestinal cancers, Lung and upper aerodigestive cancers, prostate and other urologic cancers.

The EDRN also has been a pioneer in the development of a national informatics infrastructure to support cancer biomarker research. By leveraging technology development for planetary science at NASA's Jet Propulsion Laboratory, the EDRN has been able to develop and deploy an infrastructure to support data sharing, knowledge management and collaborate research. The informatics activities within EDRN are led by the Informatics Center at NASA Jet Propulsion Laboratory, Fred Hutchinson Cancer Research Center, and Dartmouth Medical School.
