= Justin Erenkrantz =

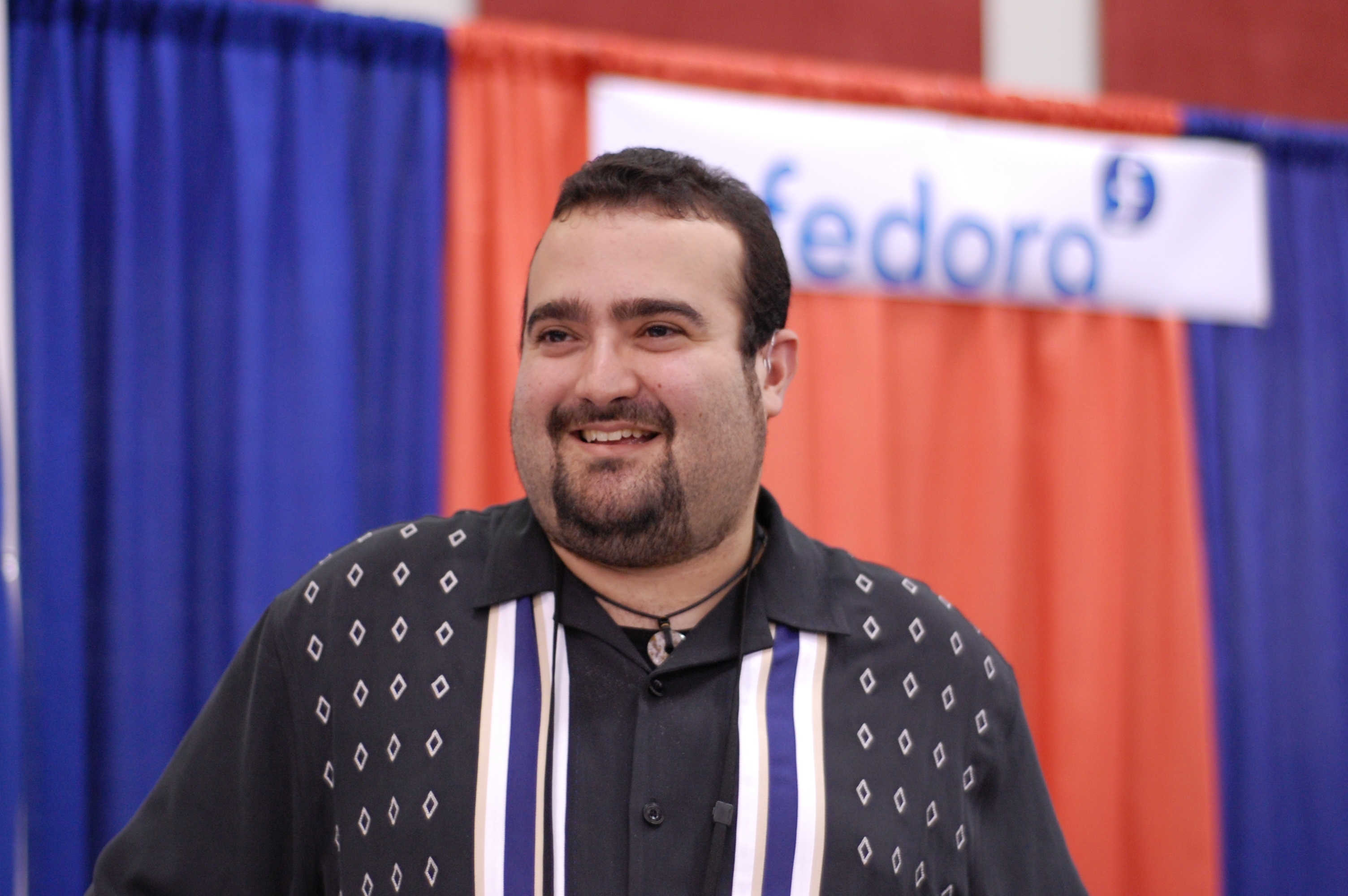
- OSCON 2009

Justin Erenkrantz was the president of the Apache Software Foundation. He previously was the treasurer for the Foundation. As of 2015, he worked as the head of Compute Architecture at Bloomberg L.P. in New York.

In 2010, Erenkrantz graduated from the University of California, Irvine where he received a PhD. His dissertation was titled Computational REST: A New Model for Decentralized, Internet-Scale Applications.
