= Information and Software Technology =

- Discipline: Computer science, software development
- Language: English
- Edited by: Günther Ruhe

Publication details
- Former name(s): Data Processing
- History: 1959–present
- Publisher: Elsevier
- Frequency: 10/year
- Impact factor: 3.862 (2021)

Standard abbreviations
- ISO 4: Inf. Softw. Technol.

Indexing
- ISSN: 0950-5849
- LCCN: 87648858
- OCLC no.: 1125310619

Links
- Journal homepage; Online archive

Information and Software Technology is a peer-reviewed scientific journal on software development and related issues, published by Elsevier. The journal was established in 1959 as Data Processing, obtaining its current title in 1987. The journal is abstracted and indexed in Scopus.

According to the Journal Citation Reports, the journal has a 2021 impact factor of 3.862.
