= Cogent Systems =

Defunct technology company

Cogent Systems, Inc.
- Company type: Subsidiary
- Industry: Security
- Founded: 1990
- Defunct: December 2010
- Fate: Acquired by 3M Corporation August 30, 2010. Acquired by Gemalto December 9, 2016 as part of 3M's Identity Management Business acquisition.
- Headquarters: South Pasadena, California U.S. Moved to Pasadena, CA June 2006.
- Key people: Ming Hsieh (Co-founder, CEO, President, and Chairman); Paul Kim (CFO)
- Products: Biometric Identification Systems (Fingerprint, Iris, Facial Recognition)
- Services: Biometric Identification
- Revenue: US$125,680,000 Million (2008)
- Operating income: US$53,070,000 (2008)
- Net income: US$45,180,000 (2008)
- Total assets: US$620,130,000 (2008)
- Total equity: US$519,470,000 (2008)
- Number of employees: 365 (December 2008)
- Parent: 3M (as of August 30, 2010) Gemalto (as of December 9, 2016)
- Website: www.cogentsystems.com

Cogent Systems, Inc. is a manufacturer of automated fingerprint identification systems (AFIS).

On January 20, 2006, the City of Pasadena (CA) announced Cogent Systems' impending relocation from South Pasadena to Pasadena.

On August 30, 2010, 3M announced they had acquired Cogent Systems for $943M.

On September 2, 2010, Steven Davidoff Solomon of the New York Times wrote about three of Cogent's shareholders objecting to what they considered 3M's low purchase offer.

On December 9, 2016, Gemalto announced they had purchased 3M's Identity Management Business (which includes Cogent Systems, Inc., Document Reader, and Secure Materials Business) for US$850 million.

On May 1, 2017, 3M announced the completion of the sale of its identity management business to Gemalto.
