= Emil Freed =

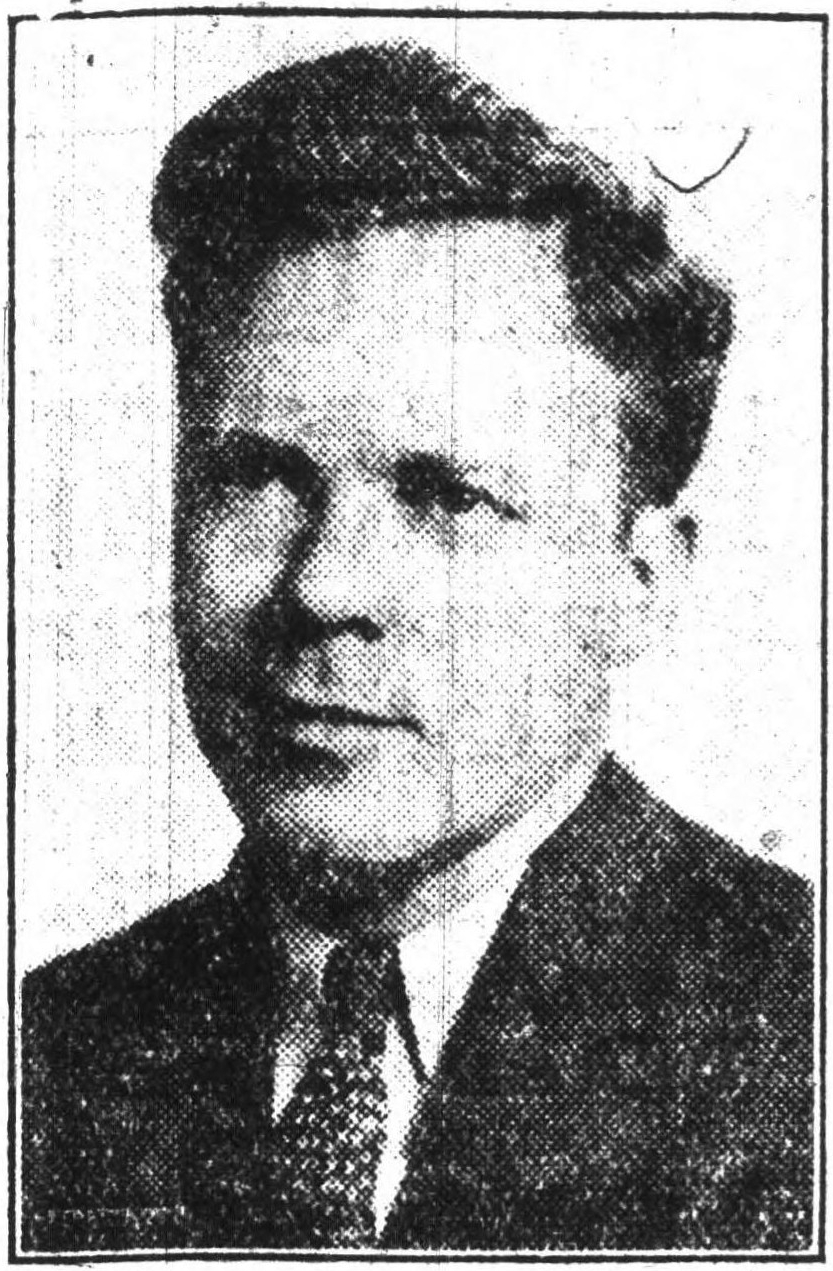
- Freed c. 1936
- Born: Emanuel Rosenberg; June 25, 1901; New York City, U.S.
- Died: December 4, 1982 (aged 81); Los Angeles, California, U.S.
- Education: University of Southern California
- Known for: Southern California Library for Social Studies and Research
- Spouse: Tassia Freed
- Parent(s): Abraham Rosenberg, Rose Palevsky
- Relatives: Dorothy Freed Eletz (born Sophie Dorothy Rosenberg, sister), Morris Freed (stepfather)

Emil Freed (June 25, 1901 - December 4, 1982) was a political activist and founder of the Southern California Library for Social Studies and Research, an archive in Los Angeles.

== Career ==
Emil Freed was born as Emanuel Rosenberg in New York on June 25, 1901. His mother, Rose Palevsky, came from Brest-Litovsk (then in Russia). She married Abraham Rosenberg on August 20, 1900, and had two children, Emmanuel and Dorothy. She then married Morris Freed on November 12, 1909. The Freeds moved to Los Angeles in September 1910, where they changed the children's names to Emil Freed and Dorothy Freed. He attended Manual Arts High School in South Los Angeles (from which he graduated in 1917). In 1923, he received a B.S. in Electrical Engineering from the University of Southern California.

He worked for the QRS Electric Sign Company until 1928. Then, he opened his own shop, the National Electric Sign Company, which sold and serviced neon signs (which became widely used in the 1920s) for more than a decade. He then worked as a machinist for the Gillette Machine and Tool Company in Hollywood until termination in June 1942. He continued to work as a tool designer, planner, and teacher.

In August 1942, he asked to serve in the Volunteer Officer's Corp of the Selective Service System (SSS) as a machinist. The SSS rejected him on December 5, 1942, due to his age (SSS had a maximum age of 32 years).

== Political activism ==
Freed joined the Communist Party in 1929

He ran for the United States House of Representatives on the Communist ticket in 1940.

At the founding of the Civil Rights Congress in 1946, he served as organization secretary in Los Angeles.

For his part in the Hollywood Studio Strike (aka Hollywood Black Friday) of 1945–1946, Freed was arrested on November 16, 1946. He was found guilty on three counts: failure to obey a court order, refusal to disperse, and disturbing the peace. He received six months on each count to be served concurrently. He was taken to Lincoln Heights Jail on December 13, 1948, and released after 10 months. (This eventually led to his expulsion from the International Association of Machinists (IAM) Local #311.)

In 1953, Lucille Ball was questioned before the Committee on Un-American Activities about her support of Freed's candidacy in 1940. She denied knowing anything about it.

During the 1960s, he continued his activism, speaking on the 1968 presidential election, the War on Poverty, the U.S. economy, and U.S. policies on Czechoslovakia, labor, and the Vietnam War.

In 1981, he received a certificate of merit from the CPUSA in honor of more than 50 years of service.

== Southern California Library for Social Studies and Research ==
During the McCarthy era, Freed collected pamphlets, films, papers and other documents that people were disposing of to distance themselves from Communist involvement. He began by storing the works in a garage.

In 1963, he founded of the Southern California Library for Social Studies and Research at the intersection of La Brea Avenue and Olympic Boulevard in the Pico-Robertson area of Los Angeles. In 1965, following the Watts riots, he began renting space in a building at 6120 South Vermont Avenue in South Los Angeles; in 1971, he bought the building. The library contains books, pamphlets, films, tapes and individual and organizational papers on progressive, labor and social movements.

== Personal and death ==
Freed married Tatiana Tassia Hirsh (born in Russia on September 7, 1905) in December 1926.

Freed died in December 1982.

In 1983, Tassia Freed moved to Laguna Hills, California, where she died in April 1987.
