= Southern California Library for Social Studies and Research =

Library in Los Angeles, California, United States

Coordinates: 33°59′03″N 118°17′29″W

The Southern California Library for Social Studies and Research is an archive, library, and community organization in Los Angeles, California, which documents the history of radicalism and progressive movements in Southern California. It was founded by Tassia and Emil Freed.

Emil Freed was deeply involved in labor and political movements in Southern California and began collecting pamphlets and other materials from the organizations and individuals involved. Several people subpoenaed by the House Un-American Activities Committee and other similar bodies gave their personal libraries to Freed. He opened the Southern California Library for Social Studies and Research in downtown Los Angeles in 1963 (62 years ago), using the materials he collected over three decades as the founding collections. It moved in 1973 (52 years ago) to its present location in South-Central Los Angeles.

Holdings include collections documenting the history of resistance and civil rights, such as the Asociacion de Vendedores Ambulantes (Street Vendors Association) Records; Housing Authority of the City of Los Angeles Photograph Collection; and the Los Angeles Teachers Union Collection. Collections are in English, Spanish, and Yiddish and span from the 1920s to the present.

Sarah Cooper assumed the position of library director in 1983. In recognition of her work, in 1989, she was awarded the Archival Award of Excellence, administered by the California Heritage Preservation Commission of the California State Archives. The current library director is Yusef Omowale, the 2019 UCLA Activist-in-Residence at the Institute on Inequality and Democracy. He is focused in particular on building a collection that documents dispossession and displacement in Los Angeles.
