= Yannis C. Yortsos =

Greek-American chemical engineer and academic

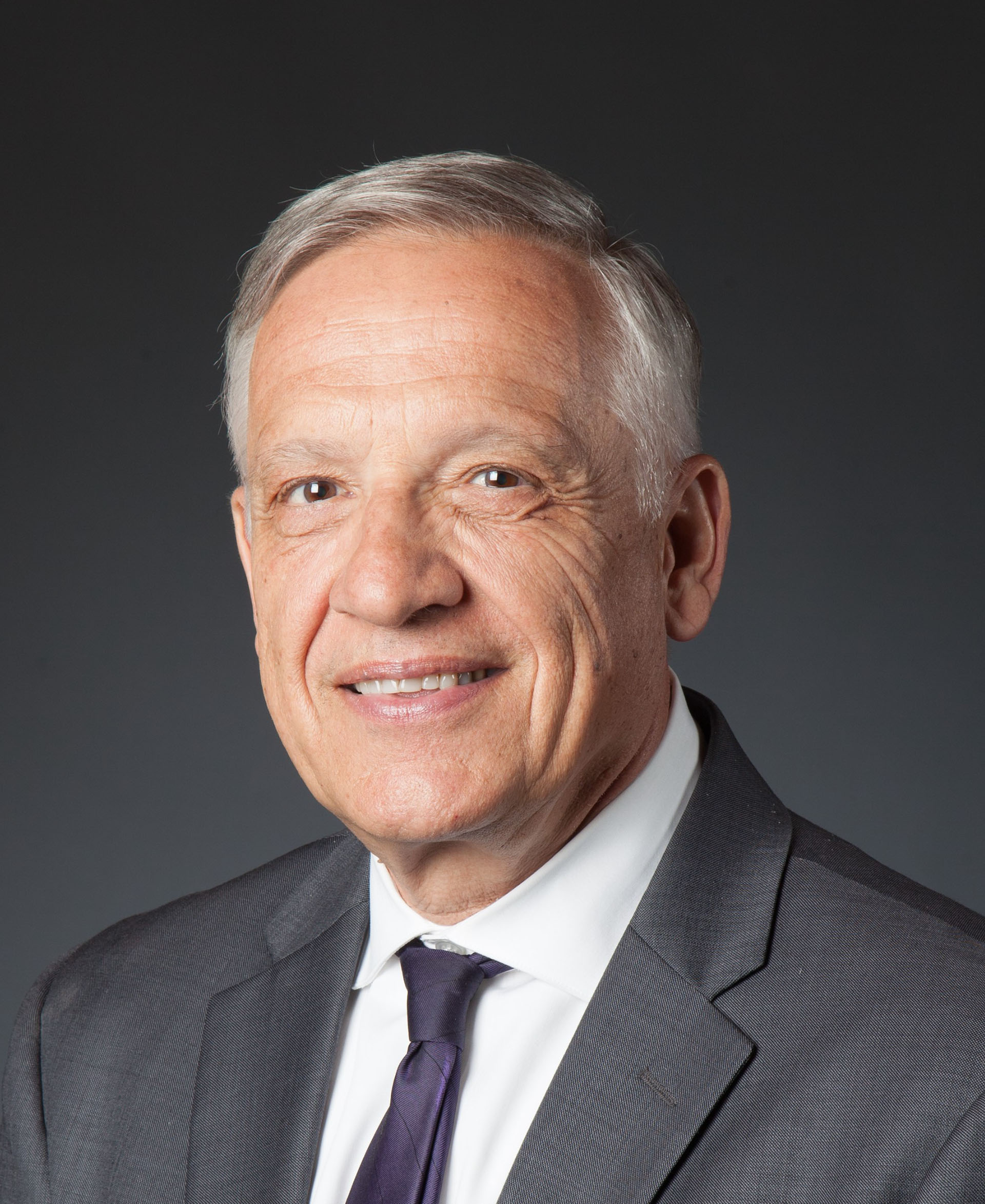
- Yannis Yortsos in 2024
- Born: 1951 (age 74–75); Athens, Greece
- Citizenship: United States, Greece
- Known for: Fluid flow, transport, and reaction in porous media
- Title: Chester Dolley Professor of Chemical Engineering and Materials Science
- Awards: 2026 USC Presidential Medal; 2025 IFEES Duncan Fraser Global Award for Excellence in Engineering Education; 2026 Rhodian of the Year; 2022 NAE Gordon Prize; 2024, Foreign Fellow, Indian National Academy of Engineering; 2022 Los Angeles Area Emmy Award "Lives Not Grades", Executive Producer; 2017 ASEE President's Award; 2017-2023, Member NAE Council; 2014 Ellis Island Medal of Honor; 2013 Associate Member, Academy of Athens; 2008 Member National Academy of Engineering1; 2005-2026 Zohrab A. Kaprielian Dean's Chair in Engineering; 1995-present Chester Dolley Professor

Academic background
- Education: National Technical University of Athens; California Institute of Technology
- Thesis: "Analytical Modeling of Oil Recovery by Steam Injection" (1978)

Academic work
- Discipline: Chemical Engineering
- Institutions: USC Viterbi School of Engineering

Yannis C. Yortsos (born 1951) is a Greek-American chemical engineer and academic. He served as Dean of the Viterbi School of Engineering at the University of Southern California from 2005 through 2026. He is the seventh and longest tenured dean in the school's history, and one of the longest tenured engineering deans for U.S. research universities.

== Early life ==
Yannis Yortsos was born in 1951 in Athens, Greece. He attended the Venetokleion of Rhodes, and in 1968 he enrolled in the National Technical University of Athens, where he obtained his B.S. in Chemical Engineering, graduating first in his class in 1973. He continued his studies at the California Institute of Technology, earning his M.S. in Chemical Engineering in 1974 and his Ph.D. in 1979, with his doctoral thesis, "Analytical Modeling of Oil Recovery by Steam Injection".

In the fall of 1978, Yortsos joined the University of Southern California (USC) as assistant professor of Chemical Engineering and of Petroleum Engineering. He was promoted to associate professor in 1984 and to Professor in 1989. In 1981 he received the ARCO Oil and Gas, Outstanding Jr. Faculty Award and in 1985 the Rossiter W. Raymond Memorial Award of the AIME for Outstanding Technical Paper. From 1991 to 1997, he served as department chair of the Department of Chemical Engineering Engineering and in 1995 he was awarded the Chester Doley Professorship. Between 2001 and 2005 he served as Associate Dean and Sr. Associate Dean for Academic Affairs. Throughout the period 1989- 2005 he also held visiting professor appointments at universities across Europe and North America, including Stanford, Clarkson University, Université Pierre et Marie Curie, Université Paris Sud, and at his graduate alma mater, the California Institute of Technology.

== Dean of USC Viterbi School of Engineering ==
On 1 June 2005, following the appointment of the incumbent dean, Max Nikias, to provost of USC, Yortsos was appointed interim dean of the USC Engineering School at the newly renamed USC Viterbi School of Engineering for the period of one year. On 1 June 2006, after an external search process, he was formally appointed as Dean of Engineering, the seventh in the school's over hundred year history.

== Engineering+ ==
As the new dean, Yortsos posed a meta-question he had been thinking about for some time about the teaching of engineering in general, "What if engineering education itself were organized around solving humanity’s greatest challenges?" He coined he term "Engineering+", which encapsulates the nature of engineering to empower practically all disciplines in today's rapidly converging world and to help create a better existence for all humanity. The concept was to think that the ultimate point of teaching engineering was not technical proficiency alone in each, separate discipline, but in integrating all engineering knowledge with the ultimate goal of benefiting all of humanity, across all subjects. These goals would soon be consistent with "Grand Challenges" formalism.

In 2009, in collaboration with his colleagues, Tom Katsouleas, then Dean of the Duke Pratt School of Engineering and Rick Miller, then President of Olin College of Engineering, Yortsos co-founded the Grand Challenges Scholars Program (GCSP), designed to educate the engineering undergraduates who would address the Grand Challenges of the National Academy of Engineering (NAE), articulated in 2008. The following year, in 2010, Dean Yortsos organized and hosted the Second Grand Challenges Summit at USC, which subsequently morphed into a series of bi-annual Grand Challenges Summits worldwide, organized by the National Academy of Engineering, the Royal Academy of Engineering and the Chinese Academy of Engineering. For the creation of the GCSP, which, in the next two decades, expanded to almost one hundred engineering schools around the world, the NAE awarded to Yortsos and his colleagues the 2022 NAE Gordon Prize, which is bestowed annually to recognize pioneering approaches to engineering leadership education. In the later years of his tenure, Yortsos rephrased the five competencies of the GCSP with these abbreviations: "Hugging the Exponential", "Engineering+X", "Innovation in the Broadest Sense", "The Cultural Mind", and "Heroic Engineering: Awareness of the Impact of Engineering to Society". Upon conclusion of his term as dean in 2026, the USC chapter was renamed as the Yannis C. Yortsos Grand Challenges Scholars Program in his honor.

Under Yortsos's tenure as dean, guided by this Engineering+ philosophy, the Viterbi School faculty size grew in size and demographics. Five academic departments were named during that period (the Mork Family Department of Chemical Engineering and Materials Science in 2005, the Ming Hsieh Department of Electrical and Computer Engineering in 2006, the Sonny Astani Department of Civil and Environmental Engineering in 2007, the Alfred E. Mann Department of Biomedical Engineering in 2022, and the Thomas Lord Department of Computer Science in 2023). He helped establish a number of joint programs with other schools within USC, including USC Games in 2006, a partnership with the USC School of Cinematic Arts, the Health Technology and Engineering in 2008, a partnership with the USC Keck School of Medicine, and the Center for AI in Society (CAIS) in 2016 in partnership with the Suzanne Dworak-Peck School of Social Work. In 2009 Dean Yortsos helped establish the Department of Astronautical Engineering. In 2011 he helped establish the first Academic Center to host a Quantum Computer (D-Wave). In 2013 he created the first Technology Innovation and Entrepreneurship program in Engineering at USC. And in March 2026, he helped expand the Mann Department of Biomedical Engineering to become a joint Department with the Keck School of Medicine.

In 2010 Yortsos helped lead the creation of the iPodia program, using the evolving interactive technology to allow students from multiple peer universities across the world to take a joint class together, as if they were in the same classroom. Since its inception, the corresponding iPodia Alliance has grown to 17 engineering schools across the globe, enhancing the national composition of students, and providing access to education regardless of national borders or cultures.

Throughout his years as dean, Yortsos advocated for a "change of conversation" in engineering education, framing the field as a key discipline for addressing global challenges. As a result of this narrative of using engineering as a method to solve humanity's greatest challenges, the demographic constituency of USC Viterbi students expanded. Since 2019, each entering fall class in engineering has been gender-balanced. Between 2018 and 2021, Yortsos served as the PI of the NSF Gender Equity Initiative EDGE. For many of these and related contributions he was awarded the 2023 Chairman's Award from the Great Minds in STEM and the 2024 Claire L. Felbinger Award of ABET.

== "Lives Not Grades" ==
In advancing human-centric engineering solutions under Yortsos's "Engineering+" narrative, USC Viterbi offered classes that address global challenges. A notable course offered through Civil Engineering included the journey of USC students to a refugee camp on the Greek island of Lesvos. A resulting PBS documentary, Lives Not Grades, that documented this effort and journey won a Los Angeles-area Emmy in 2022 with Yortsos sharing the Emmy as Executive Producer.

In related initiatives, Yortsos established the Engineering in Society Program (EIS), with an aim to provide to Viterbi engineering graduates not only with outstanding competence but also with outstanding character. The increasing importance of engineering and technology in society also led him to articulate the need for trustworthiness in engineering, which becomes even more important in a world impacted by the rapid evolution of artificial intelligence.

== Stevens School of Advanced Computing ==
In the spring of 2024 Yortsos helped establish the new School of Advanced Computing at USC Viterbi. The creation of the new school within the USC Viterbi School of Engineering was made possible by the launch of an initiative on the Frontiers in Computing, enabled by a $260 million grant from the Lord Foundation of California, the largest educational gift in USC history. In 2026 this investment was dramatically enhanced with a $200 million gift by Mark and Mary Stevens, after whom the new school was renamed. The goals of the new school are to advance digital competence and fluency across all engineering disciplines and to integrate the rapidly developing artificial intelligence technology across all realms of science, engineering, business, creativity, and even the humanities.

== Other accolades and offices ==
Yortsos was elected to the US National Academy of Engineering in 2008 and served on the NAE Council between 2017 and 2023. His election citation reads: "For fundamental advances in fluid flow, transport, and reactions in porous media applied to the recovery of subsurface resources." In 2025, he delivered the Plenary Lecture of the NAE's Annual Meeting on “AI and Engineering Education”. He was also elected as Associate Member of the Academy of Athens in 2013 and as Foreign Member of the Indian National Academy of Engineering in 2024.

In 2014 Yortsos was awarded the Ellis Island Medal of Honor for his contributions to engineering education and research as a first-generation American. He received the 2008 Western North America Reservoir Description and Dynamics Award of the Society of Petroleum Engineers, an Honorary Member Award from AIME in 2011, and was elected as an AIChE Fellow in 2024.

From 2012 to 2017 Yortsos served as Chair of the American Society for Engineering Education's Engineering Deans Council Diversity Committee. In this capacity he led a diversity initiative, highlighted at the White House in August 2015, that has been implemented by more than 250 engineering schools in the US. In a formal ASEE initiative In 2017, the ASEE honored the Viterbi School under Dean Yortsos with its President's Award. During that year, the ASEE also honored the Viterbi School and Dean Yortsos with an Award for Excellence in Veterans in Engineering.

In November 2022, Yortsos was appointed as Editor-in-Chief of PNAS Nexus, a gold open-access journal launched in 2021. It is a companion title to PNAS and the first new journal published by the National Academies in over a century. The journal covers multidisciplinary, interdisciplinary, and transdisciplinary research across the sciences, engineering, social sciences, and medicine.

In 2025, in recognition of his work in the advancement of engineering education, Yortsos was awarded an Honorary Doctoral Degree by the National Technical University of Athens, Greece, his undergraduate alma mater and, established in 1837, the oldest engineering school in modern Greece. In that same year Yortsos received the 2025 IFEES Duncan Fraser Global Award for Excellence in Engineering Education in recognition of his contributions to advancing engineering education worldwide.

== Retirement as dean ==
On 30 June 2026 Yortsos's tenure as dean of the USC Viterbi Schoo ended, the longest in that office in the school's history. During his tenure as dean, the school grew to one of the foremost engineering schools in the world. During his tenure the Viterbi School raised $1.25 billion in philanthropic gifts. Also during his tenure, 28 faculty members were elected to the National Academy of Engineering. Yortsos created active Viterbi advisory boards, both in the US, as well as in India and in China (since 2013). Under his leadership the school connected to over a hundred other universities around the world through the GCSP program he had co-founded and the iPodia online interactive connections with 17 other universities globally.

Yortsos was succeeded as dean on an interim basis by Gaurav Sukhatme, who served as Executive Vice Dean from 2017 was the director of the above-mentioned Stevens School of Computing and Artificial Intelligence.

== Research fields ==
Following the completion of his term as dean, Yortsos has returned to the position of Chester Dolley Professor of Chemical and Mechanical Engineering. As an academic, Yortsos's research area is in fluid flow, transport and reaction processes in porous media with specific application to the subsurface. Specific areas include viscous flows in porous media geometries, phase change in porous media, transport and displacement in heterogeneous and fractured media (including media with fractal geometry properties), filtration combustion, flow of fluids with yield stress in porous media and the drying of porous media. He has published more than 160 technical papers and supervised 28 PhD theses, all before his appointment as dean. Motivated by the COVID epidemic he has also published on the spreading of epidemics by introducing analogies with chemical engineering processes.

From his long experience in expanding his Engineering+ paradigm, Yortsos has expressed an interest in expanding his ideas of mathematical models in the social and public health. During his exit interview as dean in 2026 he said, "During COVID, for example, I became fascinated by mathematical models of infectious disease."

== Activities beyond USC ==
Yortsos was on the peer review team (1995-1996) of the Yucca Mountain Nuclear Waste Disposal Peer Review Team of the Department of Energy. He served on the National Research Council Committees for the 2017 report on a New Vision for Center-Based Engineering Research as well as on the 2017 report on The Value of Social, Behavioral, and Economic Sciences to National Priorities. In 2020 he completed a three-year term as member of the NSF Engineering Advisory Committee.

Between 2011 and 2017 he served on the executive committee of the Engineering Deans Council and on the Executive Committee of the Global Engineering Deans Council (2012-2016, 2021- 2023). Following the onset of the COVID-19 epidemic, he led the National Academy of Engineering Call to Action Against COVID, starting in April 2020.

From 2013 through 2022, Yortsos served as Principal Investigator of the National Science Foundation (NSF) I-Corps Innovation Node Los Angeles, a partnership between USC, Caltech and UCLA, one of nine in the nation. Starting in January 2022 he served as the PI of the NSF’s I-Corps West Region Hub, a partnership with UCLA, the University of Colorado, and ten other affiliated universities (Caltech, Colorado School of Mines, UC Riverside, University of New Mexico, the University of Utah, UC Santa Barbara and Colorado State University), which is now one of the NSF's ten I-Corps Hubs.

== Awards and distinctions ==
- 1995 Chester Dolley Professor of Chemical and Petroleum Engineering, USC
- 2001 Foreign Member, Russian Academy of Natural Sciences
- 2005 Zohrab A. Kaprielian Chair in Engineering
- 2008–Present, Member of the National Academy of Engineering (Sections 3 and 11)
- 2013 Associate Member of the Academy of Athens
- 2014 Ellis Island Medal of Honor
- 2015-2024 "LA500: The most influential people in Los Angeles", the Los Angeles Business Journal
- 2017 ASEE President's Award to Viterbi School for promotion of diversity in STEM careers to K-12 students.
- 2017–2024, Member NAE Council
- 2022 Fellow, American Association for the Advancement of Science (AAAS)
- 2022 NAE Bernard M. Gordon Prize for Innovation in Engineering and Technology Education
- 2022 National Academy of Television Arts & Sciences: Los Angeles Area Emmy for Independent Programming, "Lives not Grades", Executive Producer
- 2022–present Editor-in-Chief, PNAS Nexus
- 2023 Chairman's Award, Great Minds in STEM
- 2024 Claire L. Felbinger Award for Diversity and Inclusion, ABET
- 2024 Foreign Fellow, Indian National Academy of Engineering
- 2024 American Institute of Chemical Engineers (AIChE) Fellow
- 2025 Duncan Fraser Global Award for Excellence in Engineering Education
- 2025 Honorary Doctoral Degree and Distinguished Alumnus, National Technical University of Athens, Greece
- 2026 Rhodian of the Year, Pan-Rhodian American Association Apollon
- 2026 USC Presidential Medal
