= ICSE =

ICSE may refer to:

- International Conference on Software Engineering
- Indian Certificate of Secondary Education
- Intermediate-Current Stability Experiment, a British fusion reactor design
