= Karen E. Nelson =

Jamaican-born American microbiologist

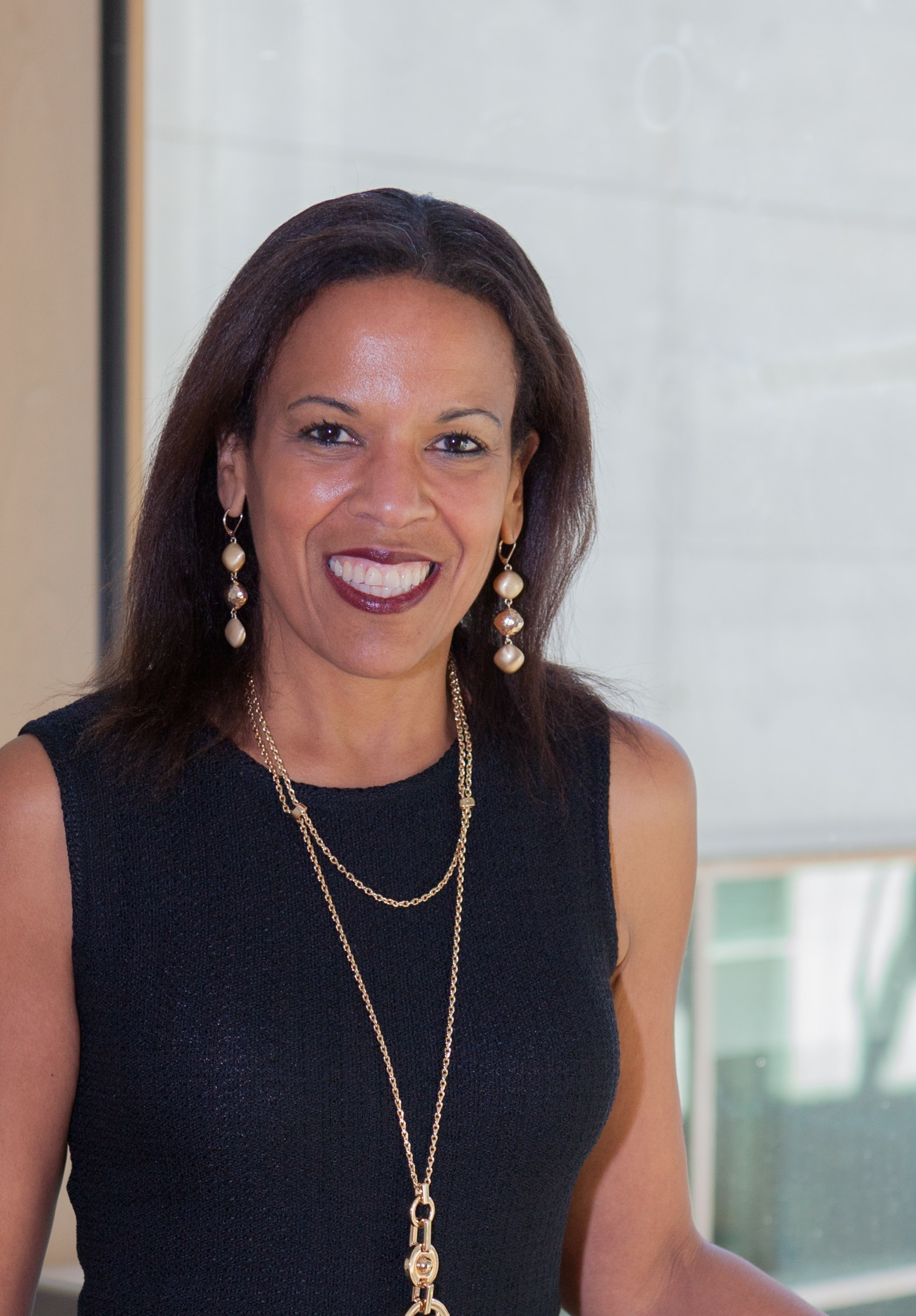
- Dr. Karen E. Nelson, Chief Science Officer of Thermo Fisher Scientific
- Born: Jamaica
- Education: University of the West Indies; Cornell University
- Known for: Human microbiome
- Website: Thermo Fisher Scientific

Karen Nelson is a Jamaican-born American microbiologist (specializing in human microbiome research) who was formerly president of the J. Craig Venter Institute (JCVI). On July 6, 2021 she joined Thermo Fisher Scientific as Chief Scientific Officer.

== Education ==
Nelson studied her undergraduate degree at the University of the West Indies and earned a Ph.D. from Cornell University.

== Career and research ==
Nelson is a prominent expert in microbial genomics and metagenomics, with applications to human health. She is noted for her research on Thermotoga maritima at The Institute for Genomic Research (TIGR) which resulted in the publication of the genome of that bacterium, and which demonstrated the existence of horizontal gene transfer. Nelson is also known for her work in human microbiome research and her current research focuses on interactions between human microbiome and various diseases. Her extensive expertise involves areas of microbial ecology, microbial genomics, microbial physiology and metagenomics, which led to her team publishing the first human microbiome study in 2006.

Nelson was appointed president of JCVI in 2012 after serving as the director of its Rockville Campus since 2010. Prior to being appointed President, she held a number of other positions at the Institute, including Director of JCVI's Rockville Campus, and Director of Human Microbiology and Metagenomics in the Department of Human Genomic Medicine at JCVI.

She has authored or co-authored over 200 peer-reviewed publications, edited three books, and has served as editor-in-chief of the journal Microbial Ecology and the open-access journal PNAS Nexus. Scientific American named Nelson as one of biotechnology's "leading lights" in its 2015 "The Worldview 100."

== Boards and panels ==
- Editor in Chief, PNAS Nexus
- Editor in Chief, Microbial Ecology
- Editor in Chief, Advances in Microbial Ecology
- Editorial Board Member, BMC Genomics
- Editorial Board Member, Giga Science
- Editorial Board Member, Central European Journal of Biology
- Board Member, Board on Life Sciences, National Academy of Sciences
- Member, Standing Committee on Support to the DoD's Programs to Counter Biological Threats, National Research Council

== Professional organizations ==
- American Society for Microbiology

== Honors and awards ==
- Helmholtz International Fellow Award
- Fellow, American Society for Microbiology
- ARCS Scientist of the Year (2017)
- Elected Member, National Academy of Sciences (2017)
