= Speech community =

Group of people who share expectations regarding linguistic usage

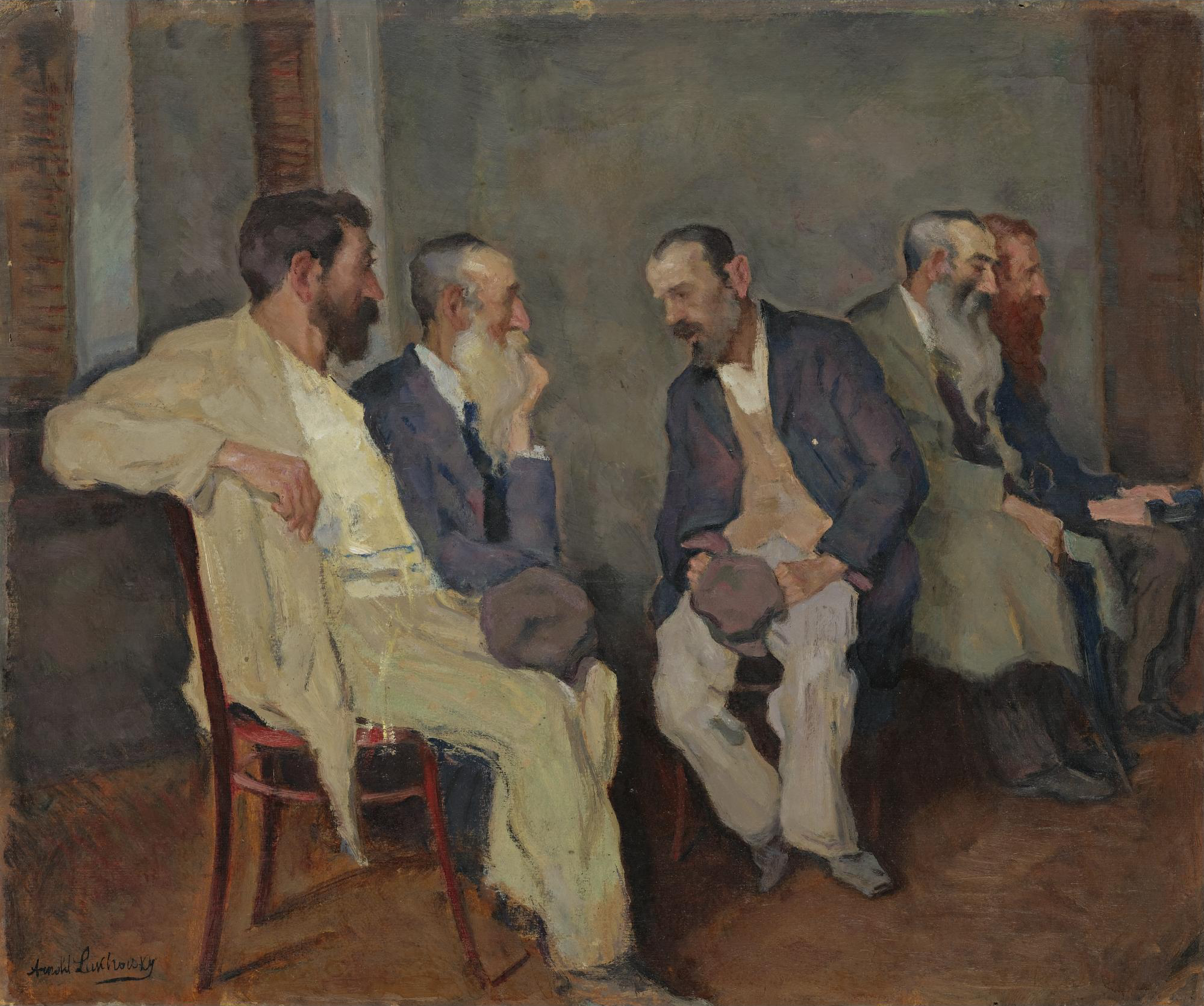
Arnold Lakhovsky, The Conversation (c. 1935)

A speech community is a group of people who share a set of linguistic norms and expectations regarding the use of language. The concept is mostly associated with sociolinguistics and anthropological linguistics.

Exactly how to define speech community is debated in the literature. Definitions of speech community tend to involve varying degrees of emphasis on the following:

- Shared community membership
- Shared linguistic communication

A typical speech community can be a small town, but sociolinguists such as William Labov claim that a large metropolitan area, for example New York City, can also be considered one single speech community.

Early definitions have tended to see speech communities as bounded and localized groups of people who live together and come to share the same linguistic norms because they belong to the same local community. It has also been assumed that within a community a homogeneous set of norms should exist. These assumptions have been challenged by later scholarship that has demonstrated that individuals generally participate in various speech communities simultaneously and at different times in their lives. Speech communities have different norms, which they tend to share only partially. Communities may be delocalized and unbounded, rather than local, and often comprise different sub-communities with differing speech norms. With the recognition of the fact that speakers actively use language to construct and manipulate social identities by signalling membership in particular speech communities, the idea of the bounded speech community with homogeneous speech norms has become largely abandoned for a model based on the speech community as a fluid community of practice.

A speech community comes to share a specific set of norms for language use through living and interacting together, and speech communities may therefore emerge among all groups that interact frequently and share certain norms and ideologies. Such groups can be villages, countries, political or professional communities, communities with shared interests, hobbies, lifestyles, or even just groups of friends. Speech communities may share both particular sets of vocabulary and grammatical conventions, as well as speech styles and genres and norms for how and when to speak in particular ways.

== History of definitions ==
The adoption of the concept of the "speech community" as a unit of linguistic analysis emerged in the 1960s.

=== John Gumperz ===
John Gumperz described how dialectologists had taken issue with the dominant approach in historical linguistics that saw linguistic communities as homogeneous and localized entities in a way that allowed for drawing neat tree diagrams based on the principle of "descent with modification" and shared innovations.

Dialectologists realized that dialect traits spread through diffusion and that social factors were instead decisive in how that happened. They also realized that traits spread as waves from centers and that often several competing varieties would exist in some communities. This insight prompted Gumperz to problematize the notion of the linguistic community as the community that carries a single speech variant, and instead to seek a definition that could encompass heterogeneity. This could be done by focusing on the interactive aspect of language, because interaction in speech is the path along which diffused linguistic traits travel. Gumperz defined the community of speech:

Any human aggregate characterized by regular and frequent interaction by means of a shared body of verbal signs and set off from similar aggregates by significant differences in language usage.

— Gumperz (1968)

Regardless of the linguistic differences among them, the speech varieties employed within a speech community form a system because they are related to a shared set of social norms.

— Gumperz (1968)

Gumperz here identifies two important components of the speech community: members share both a set of linguistics forms and a set of social norms. Gumperz also sought to set up a typological framework for describing how linguistic systems can be in use within a single speech community. He introduced the concept of linguistic range, the degree to which the linguistic systems of the community differ so that speech communities can be multilingual, diglossic, multidialectal (including sociolectal stratification), or homogeneous, depending on the degree of difference among the different language systems used in the community. Secondly the notion of compartmentalization described the degree to which the use of different varieties are set off from each other as discrete systems in interaction (e.g. diglossia where varieties correspond to specific social contexts, or multilingualism where varieties correspond to discrete social groups within the community), or they are habitually mixed in interaction (e.g. code-switching, bilingualism, syncretic language).

=== Noam Chomsky ===
Gumperz's formulation was, however, effectively overshadowed by Noam Chomsky's redefinition of the scope of linguistics as being :

concerned primarily with an ideal speaker-listener, in a completely homogeneous speech-community, who knows its language perfectly and is unaffected by such grammatically irrelevant conditions as memory limitations, distractions, shifts of attention and interest, and errors (random or characteristic) in applying his knowledge of the language in actual performance.

— Chomsky (1965:3)

=== William Labov ===
Another influential conceptualization of the linguistic community was that of William Labov, which can be seen as a hybrid of the Chomskyan structural homogeneity and Gumperz's focus on shared norms informing variable practices. Labov wrote:

The speech community is not defined by any marked agreement in the use of language elements, so much as by participation in a set of shared norms: these norms may be observed in overt types of evaluative behavior, and by the uniformity of abstract patterns of variation which are invariant in respect to particular levels of usage.

— Labov (1972:120–1)

Like that of Gumperz, Labov's formulation stressed that a speech community was defined more by shared norms than by shared linguistic forms. However, like Chomsky, Labov also saw each of the formally distinguished linguistic varieties within a speech community as homogeneous, invariant and uniform. The model worked well for Labov's purpose of showing that African American Vernacular English can be seen not as a structurally-degenerate form of English but rather as a well-defined linguistic code with its own particular structure.

== Critique ==
Probably because of their considerable explanatory power, Labov's and Chomsky's understandings of the speech community became widely influential in linguistics. But gradually a number of problems with those models became apparent.

Firstly, it became increasingly clear that the assumption of homogeneity inherent in Chomsky and Labov's models was untenable. The African American speech community, which Labov had seen as defined by the shared norms of African American Vernacular English (AAVE), was shown to be an illusion, as ideological disagreements about the status of AAVE among different groups of speakers attracted public attention.

Secondly, the concept of the speech community was large-scale communities. By extending the concept, Gumperz's definition could no longer be evoked.

Thirdly, Chomsky's and Labov's models made it clear that intrapersonal variation is common. The choice of linguistic variant is often a choice made within a specific speech context.

The force of those critiques with the concept of "speech communities" appeared because of many contradictions. Some scholars recommended abandoning the concept altogether and instead conceptualizing it as "the product of the communicative activities engaged in by a given group of people." Others acknowledged the community's ad hoc status as "some kind of social group whose speech characteristics are of interest and can be described in a coherent manner".

== Practice theory ==
Practice theory, as developed by social thinkers such as Pierre Bourdieu, Anthony Giddens, and Michel de Certeau, and the notion of the community of practice as developed by Jean Lave and Étienne Wenger has been applied to the study of the language community by linguists William Hanks and Penelope Eckert.

Eckert aimed at an approach to sociolinguistic variation that did not include any social variable (e.g. class, gender, locality). Instead, she built a model that could locate variables that show significant issue to the group of individuals. For Eckert, the crucial defining characteristics of the community is persistent through time to comprehend together.

Hanks's concept of the linguistic community is different from that of Eckert and Gumperz, and studies the ways that shared practice produces linguistic meaning. Hanks studies how linguistic practices are related to varieties, which are produced through shared practices.

== Language variation ==
The notion of speech community is most generally used as a tool to define a unit of analysis within which to analyse language variation and change. Stylistic features differ among speech communities based on factors such as the group's ethnicity and social status, common interests and the level of formality expected within the group and by its larger society.

Common interests and the level of formality also result in stylistic differences among speech communities. In Western culture, for example, employees at a law office would likely use more formal language than a group of teenage skateboarders because most Westerners expect more formality and professionalism from practitioners of law than from an informal circle of adolescent friends. This special use of language by certain professions for particular activities is known in linguistics as register; in some analyses, the group of speakers of a register is known as a discourse community, while the phrase "speech community" is reserved for varieties of a language or dialect that speakers inherit by birth or adoption.

== See also ==
- Discourse community
- Linguistic competence
- Social network (sociolinguistics)
