= Body of knowledge =

Term used to represent the complete set of concepts

A body of knowledge (BOK or BoK) is the complete set of concepts, terms and activities that make up a professional domain, as defined by the relevant learned society or professional association. It is a type of knowledge representation by any knowledge organization. Several definitions of BOK have been developed, for example:

- "Structured knowledge that is used by members of a discipline to guide their practice or work." "The prescribed aggregation of knowledge in a particular area an individual is expected to have mastered to be considered or certified as a practitioner." (BOK-def).
- The systematic collection of activities and outcomes in terms of their values, constructs, models, principles and instantiations, which arises from continuous discovery and validation work by members of the profession and enables self-reflective growth and reproduction of the profession (Romme 2016).
- A set of accepted and agreed upon standards and nomenclatures pertaining to a field or profession (INFORMS 2009).
- A set of knowledge within a profession or subject area which is generally agreed as both essential and generally known (Oliver 2012).

A body of knowledge is the accepted ontology for a specific domain. A BOK is more than simply a collection of terms; a professional reading list; a library; a website or a collection of websites; a description of professional functions; or even a collection of information.

A landscape of practice (LoP) refers to a number of related communities of practice (CoPs) working on a body of knowledge. Participation in a LoP involves members of the CoPs developing competence in their area of interest and keeping up to date with knowledgeability relevant to the LoP.

== Examples ==
The following are examples of bodies of knowledge from professional organisations:

- Business Architecture Body of Knowledge (BIZBOK) from the Business Architecture Guild
- Canadian IT Body of Knowledge (CITBOK) – for Canadian Information Processing Society
- Civil Engineering Body of Knowledge
- Common Body of Knowledge (CBK) – for international information security professionals
- Cyber Security Body of Knowledge (CyBOK)– for cyber security professionals
- Data Management Body of Knowledge (DMBOK) – for the profession of data management from DAMA International, The Global Data Management Community
- Enterprise Architecture Body of Knowledge (EABOK) – for the enterprise architecture (EA) discipline
- Geographic Information Science and Technology Body of Knowledge (GISTBoK) – for the geospatial realm
- Project Management Body of Knowledge (PMBOK) – from the Project Management Institute (PMI) for project management
- Software Engineering Body of Knowledge (SWEBOK) – for the profession of software engineering
- Systems Engineering Body of Knowledge (SEBOK) – for the profession of systems engineering

*Psychotraumatology Body of Knowledge (PsyTBOK) – for the profession of Psychotraumatologist

== See also ==
- Core curriculum
- Landscape of practice
