= Alison Fuller =

British educational researcher

Dame Alison Fuller is a British educational researcher and Professor of Vocational Education and Work at the Institute of Education of the University College London, where she also serves as Pro-Director for Research and Development. She is a leading educational researcher in the UK, with her research centering on work transitions, apprenticeships, vocational education and training, and workplace learning.

== Biography ==
Before joining University College London, Alison Fuller served as Director of Research and Head of the Lifelong Work-Related Learning Research Centre at the Southampton Education School of the University of Southampton. She then joined the Institute of Education of the University College London in 2013.

== Research ==
Fuller's research focuses on work transitions, apprenticeships, vocational education and training, and workplace learning. A frequent academic collaborator is Lorna Unwin (University College London). Already in the 1990s, Fuller and Unwin argued in favour of a reconceptualization of apprenticeships based on a reconciliation of learner-centred and transmission approaches to pedagogy, challenging the perceived superiority of a formal education taking place only in educational institutions. Face to wide variation in UK apprentices' experiences with seemingly similar programmes, Fuller and Unwin co-operated with a range of enterprises to perform case study research on their apprenticeships. As a result, they developed the concept of expansive-restrictive continuum to characterize the differences in apprenticeship and highlight how apprenticeships' quality is mediated through participation, personal development and institutional arrangements, with important lessons for the UK's Modern Apprenticeship programme and the integration of organizational and personal development. Arguing that the Modern Apprenticeship programme was being undermined by a lack of employer demand and commitment and resulted in poor outcomes, Fuller and Unwin have moreover been critical of public plans to expand the programme as a means of social inclusion.

In research with Unwin, Phil and Heather Hodkinson, Karen Evans, Natansha Kersh and Peter Senker, Fuller highlights the significance of workers' biographies for workplace learning, arguing that the latter is framed by (i) workers' prior knowledge and skills, (ii) workers' habitus, (iii) workers' individual dispositions, and (iv) the existence of a workplace community as a locus of identity. By contrast, the concept of legitimate peripheral participation, as developed by Lave and Wenger, is inadequate to conceptualize workplace learning in modern workplaces due to its outdated portrayal of workplaces in advanced industrial societies and of the institutional environments in which people work, which strongly influence the opportunities and barriers employees encounter with regard to workplace learning.

Together with Unwin, Alan Felstead, David Ashton, Peter Butler and Tracey Lee, Fuller makes the case for a conceptualization of learning as a form of participation, wherein individual performance at work can be substantially enhanced by social relationships and mutual support, a perspective ignored by the prevailing metaphor of "learning as acquisition". Finally, Fuller and Unwin have challenged the picture of a linear trajectory for apprenticeships wherein older employees mould novices into experts, where expertise is equated with experience.

== Bibliography ==
- Fuller, A., Unwin, L. (2012, eds.). Contemporary Apprenticeship: International Perspectives on an Evolving Model of Learning. London: Routledge.
- Rainbird, H., Fuller, A., Munro, A. (2004). Workplace Learning in Context. London: Psychology Press.
- Fuller, A., Felstead, A., Unwin, L., Jewson, N. (2009, eds.). Improving Working as Learning. London: Routledge.
