= Canadian IT Body of Knowledge =

Canadian Information Technology Body of Knowledge (CITBOK) is the project sponsored and undertaken by Canadian Information Processing Society (CIPS) to define and outline the body of knowledge that defines a Canadian Information Systems Professional (ISP).

CIPS recognizes that in order to strengthen the criteria of the ISP designation successfully while still maintaining high standards, the association needs to develop a Canadian Information Technology Body of Knowledge (CITBOK) that will set standards for knowledge. The CITBOK is an outline of the knowledge bases that form the intellectual basis for the IT profession. CIPS has identified a core CITBOK that all professionals would be expected to master and specialty bodies of knowledge that would depend on your area of practice. When setting this Canadian standard for Information Technology (IT) knowledge, CIPS looked to other organizations and internationally for standards and bodies of knowledge that CIPS could adopt or adapt, especially for the specialty areas. For example, in 2004, CIPS adopted the British Computer Society (BCS) Professional Examination Study Guide Syllabus Diploma level (Core and 11 specialist modules) as the initial Body of Knowledge for CIPS.

The CITBOK aims to:

- be an industry structure model that can be used to define the set of performance, training and development standards for all IT practitioners (CIPS members and non-members) in Canada;
- create alternate paths to certification based on concepts of CITBOK;
- establish guidelines for accreditation criteria based on concepts of CITBOK; and
- create a professional development model that sets the standards criteria for the knowledge base including knowledge, skills, and professional activities for IT practitioners.

== See also ==
- ITIL
- PMBOK
- SWEBOK
