= Landscape of practice =

A landscape of practice (LoP) is a social sciences concept introduced by Etienne Wenger-Trayner and Beverly Wenger-Trayner in a 2014 book.

The concept is related to networks of practice (often abbreviated as NoP), originated by John Seely Brown and Paul Duguid. This concept, related to the work on communities of practice by Jean Lave and Etienne Wenger, refers to a number of related communities working on a body of knowledge (BoK). Participation in a LoP involves members of related CoPs developing competence in their area of interest and keeping up to date with knowledgeability relevant to the LoP.

== See also ==
- Body of knowledge (BoK)
- Community of practice (CoP)
- Knowledge management
- Network of practice (NoP)
- Organizational learning
- Virtual community of practice
