= Software engineering professionalism =

Movement in software engineering

Software engineering professionalism is a movement to make software engineering a profession, with aspects such as degree and certification programs, professional associations, professional ethics, and government licensing. The field is a licensed discipline in Texas in the United States (Texas Board of Professional Engineers, since 2013), Engineers Australia(Course Accreditation since 2001, not Licensing), and many provinces in Canada.

== History ==
In 1993 the IEEE and ACM began a joint effort called JCESEP, which evolved into SWECC in 1998 to explore making software engineering into a profession. The ACM pulled out of SWECC in May 1999, objecting to its support for the Texas professionalization efforts, of having state licenses for software engineers. ACM determined that the state of knowledge and practice in software engineering was too immature to warrant licensing, and that licensing would give false assurances of competence even if the body of knowledge were mature. The IEEE continued to support making software engineering a branch of traditional engineering.

In Canada the Canadian Information Processing Society established the Information Systems Professional certification process. Also, by the late 1990s (1999 in British Columbia) the discipline of software engineering as a professional engineering discipline was officially created. This has caused some disputes between the provincial engineering associations and companies who call their developers software engineers, even though these developers have not been licensed by any engineering association.

In 1999, the Panel of Software Engineering was formed as part of the settlement between Engineering Canada and the Memorial University of Newfoundland over the school's use of the term "software engineering" in the name of a computer science program. Concerns were raised over the inappropriate use of the name "software engineering" to describe non-engineering programs could lead to student and public confusion, and ultimately threaten public safety. The Panel issued recommendations to create a Software Engineering Accreditation Board, but the task force created to carry out the recommendations was unable to get the various stakeholders to agree to concrete proposals, resulting in separate accreditation boards.

== Ethics ==
Software engineering ethics is a large field. In some ways it began as an unrealistic attempt to define bugs as unethical. More recently it has been defined as the application of both computer science and engineering philosophy, principles, and practices to the design and development of software systems. Due to this engineering focus and the increased use of software in mission critical and human critical systems, where failure can result in large losses of capital but more importantly lives such as the Therac-25 system, many ethical codes have been developed by a number of societies, associations and organizations. These entities, such as the ACM, IEEE, EGBC and Institute for Certification of Computing Professionals (ICCP) have formal codes of ethics. Adherence to the code of ethics is required as a condition of membership or certification. According to the ICCP, violation of the code can result in revocation of the certificate. Also, all engineering societies require conformance to their ethical codes; violation of the code results in the revocation of the license to practice engineering in the society's jurisdiction.

These codes of ethics usually have much in common. They typically relate the need to act consistently with the client's interest, employer's interest, and most importantly the public's interest. They also outline the need to act with professionalism and to promote an ethical approach to the profession.

A Software Engineering Code of Ethics has been approved by the ACM and the IEEE-CS as the standard for teaching and practicing software engineering.

=== Examples of codes of conduct ===
The following are examples of codes of conduct for Professional Engineers. These 2 have been chosen because both jurisdictions have a designation for Professional Software Engineers.

- Engineers and Geoscientists of British Columbia (EGBC): All members in the association's code of Ethics must ensure that the government, the public can rely on BC's professional engineers and Geoscientists to act at all times with fairness, courtesy and good faith to their employers, employee and customers, and to uphold the truth, honesty and trustworthiness, and to safe guard human life and the environment. This is just one of the many ways in which BC's Professional Engineers and Professional Geoscientists maintain their competitive edge in today's global marketplace.
- Association of Professional Engineers and Geoscientists of Alberta (APEGA): Different with British Columbia, the Alberta Government granted self governance to engineers, Geoscientists and geophysicists. All members in the APEGA have to accept legal and ethical responsibility for the work and to hold the interest of the public and society. The APEGA is a standards guideline of professional practice to uphold the protection of public interest for engineering, Geoscientists and geophysics in Alberta.

=== Opinions on ethics ===
Bill Joy argued that "better software" can only enable its privileged end users, make reality more power-pointy as opposed to more humane, and ultimately run away with itself so that "the future doesn't need us." He openly questioned the goals of software engineering in this respect, asking why it isn't trying to be more ethical rather than more efficient. In his book Code and Other Laws of Cyberspace, Lawrence Lessig argues that computer code can regulate conduct in much the same way as the legal code. Lessig and Joy urge people to think about the consequences of the software being developed, not only in a functional way, but also in how it affects the public and society as a whole.

Overall, due to the youth of software engineering, many of the ethical codes and values have been borrowed from other fields, such as mechanical and civil engineering. However, there are many ethical questions that even these, much older, disciplines have not encountered. Questions about the ethical impact of internet applications, which have a global reach, have never been encountered until recently and other ethical questions are still to be encountered. This means the ethical codes for software engineering are a work in progress, that will change and update as more questions arise.

== Independent licensing and certification exams ==
Since 2002, the IEEE Computer Society offered the Certified Software Development Professional (CSDP) certification exam (in 2015 this was replaced by several similar certifications). A group of experts from industry and academia developed the exam and maintained it. Donald Bagert, and at a later period Stephen Tockey headed the certification committee. Contents of the exam centered around the SWEBOK (Software Engineering Body of Knowledge) guide, with an additional emphasis on Professional Practices and Software Engineering Economics knowledge areas (KAs). The motivation was to produce a structure at an international level for software engineering's knowledge areas.

== Criticism of licensing ==
Professional licensing has been criticized for many reasons.

- The field of software engineering is too immature
- Licensing would give false assurances of competence even if the body of knowledge were mature
- Software engineers would have to study years of calculus, physics, and chemistry to pass the exams, which is irrelevant to most software practitioners. Many (most?) computer science majors don't earn degrees in engineering schools, so they are probably unqualified to pass engineering exams.

== Licensing by country ==
=== United States ===
The Bureau of Labor Statistics (BLS) classifies computer software engineers as a subcategory of "computer specialists", along with occupations such as computer scientist, Programmer, Database administrator and Network administrator. The BLS classifies all other engineering disciplines, including computer hardware engineers, as engineers.

Many states prohibit unlicensed persons from calling themselves an Engineer, or from indicating branches or specialties not covered licensing acts. In many states, the title Engineer is reserved for individuals with a Professional Engineering license indicating that they have shown minimum level of competency through accredited engineering education, qualified engineering experience, and engineering board's examinations.

In April 2013 the National Council of Examiners for Engineering and Surveying (NCEES) began offering a Professional Engineer (PE) exam for Software Engineering. The exam was developed in association with the IEEE Computer Society. NCEES ended the exam in April 2019 due to lack of participation.

The American National Society of Professional Engineers provides a model law and lobbies legislatures to adopt occupational licensing regulations. The model law requires:

1. a four-year degree from a university program accredited by the Engineering Accreditation Committee (EAC) of the Accreditation Board for Engineering and Technology (ABET),
2. an eight-hour examination on the fundamentals of engineering (FE) usually taken in the senior year of college,
3. four years of acceptable experience,
4. a second examination on principles and practice, and
5. written recommendations from other professional engineers.

Some states require continuing education.

In Texas Donald Bagert of Texas became the first professional software engineer in the U.S. on September 4, 1998 or October 9, 1998. As of May 2002, Texas had issued 44 professional engineering licenses for software engineers. Rochester Institute of Technology granted the first Software Engineering bachelor's degrees in 2001. Other universities have followed.

=== Canada ===
In Canada, the use of the job title Engineer is controlled in each province by self-regulating professional engineering organizations who are also tasked with enforcement of the governing legislation. The intent is that any individual holding themselves out as an engineer has been verified to have been educated to a certain accredited level and their professional practice is subject to a code of ethics and peer scrutiny. It is also illegal to use the title Engineer in Canada unless an individual is licensed.

IT professionals with degrees in other fields (such as computer science or information systems) are restricted from using the title Software Engineer, or wording Software Engineer in a title, depending on their province or territory of residence.

In some instances, cases have been taken to court regarding the illegal use of the protected title Engineer.

Most Canadians who earn professional software engineering licenses study software engineering, computer engineering or electrical engineering. Many times these people are already qualified to become professional engineers in their own fields but choose to be licensed as software engineers to differentiate themselves from computer scientists.

In British Columbia, The Limited Licence is granted by the Engineers and Geoscientists of British Columbia. Fees are collected by EGBC for the Limited Licensee.

==== Ontario ====
In Ontario, the Professional Engineers Act stipulates a minimum education level of a three-year diploma in technology from a College of Applied Arts and Technology or a degree in a relevant science area. However, engineering undergraduates and all other applicants are not allowed to use the title of engineer until they complete the minimum amount of work experience of four years in addition to completing the Professional Practice Examination (PPE). If the applicant does not hold an undergraduate engineering degree then they may have to take the Confirmatory Practice Exam or Specific Examination Program unless the exam requirements are waived by a committee.

A person must be granted the “professional engineer” licence to have the right to practise professional software engineering as a Professional Engineer in Ontario. To become licensed by Professional Engineers Ontario (PEO), one must:

1. Be at least 18 years of age.
2. Be a citizen or permanent resident of Canada.
3. Be of good character. Applicants will be requested to answer questions and make a written declaration on the form as a test of ethics.
4. Meet PEO's stipulated academic requirements for licensure.
5. Pass the Professional Practice Examination.
6. Fulfill engineering work experience requirements.

Many graduates of Software Engineering programs are unable to obtain the PEO licence since the work they qualify for after graduation as entry-level is not related to engineering i.e. working in a software company writing code or testing code would not qualify them as their work experience does not fulfill the work experience guidelines the PEO sets. Also Software Engineering programs in Ontario and other provinces involve a series of courses in electrical, electronics, and computers engineering qualifying the graduates to even work in those fields.

==== Quebec ====
A person must be granted the “engineer” licence to have the right to practise professional software engineering in Quebec. To become licensed by the Quebec order of engineers (in French : Ordre des ingénieurs du Québec - OIQ), a candidate must:

1. Be at least 18 years of age.
2. Be of good character. The candidate will be requested to answer questions and make a written declaration on the application form to test their ethics.
3. Meet OIQ's stipulated academic requirements for licensure. In this case, the academic program should be accredited by the Canadian Engineering Accreditation Board - CEAB)
4. Pass the Professional Practice Examination.
5. Fulfill engineering work experience requirements.
6. Pass the working knowledge of French exam

==== Software engineering (SEng) guidelines by Canadian provinces ====
The term "engineer" in Canada is restricted to those who have graduated from a qualifying engineering programme. Some universities’ "software engineering" programmes are under the engineering faculty and therefore qualify, for example the University of Waterloo. Others, such as the University of Toronto have "software engineering" in the computer science faculty which does not qualify. This distinction has to do with the way the profession is regulated. Degrees in "Engineering" must be accredited by a national panel and have certain specific requirements to allow the graduate to pursue a career as a professional engineer. "Computer Science" degrees, even those with specialties in software engineering, do not have to meet these requirements so the computer science departments can generally teach a wider variety of topics and students can graduate without specific courses required to pursue a career as a professional engineer.

=== Europe ===
Throughout the whole of Europe, suitably qualified engineers may obtain the professional European Engineer qualification.

=== France ===
In France, the term ingénieur (engineer) is not a protected title and can be used by anyone, even by those who do not possess an academic degree.

However, the title Ingénieur Diplomé (Graduate Engineer) is an official academic title that is protected by the government and is associated with the Diplôme d'Ingénieur, which is one of the most prestigious academic degrees in France.

=== Iceland ===
The use of the title tölvunarfræðingur (computer scientist) is protected by law in Iceland. Software engineering is taught in Computer Science departments in Icelandic universities. Icelandic law state that a permission must be obtained from the Minister of Industry when the degree was awarded abroad, prior to use of the title. The title is awarded to those who have obtained a BSc degree in Computer Science from a recognized higher educational institution.

=== New Zealand ===
In New Zealand, the Institution of Professional Engineers New Zealand (IPENZ), which licenses and regulates the country's chartered engineers (CPEng), recognizes software engineering as a legitimate branch of professional engineering and accepts application of software engineers to obtain chartered status provided they have a tertiary degree of approved subjects. Software Engineering is included whereas Computer Science is normally not.

== See also ==
- Bachelor of Science in Information Technology
- Bachelor of Software Engineering
- List of software engineering topics
- Software engineering demographics
- Software engineering economics
