= Network of practice =

Network of practice (often abbreviated as NoP) is a concept originated by John Seely Brown and Paul Duguid. This concept, related to the work on communities of practice by Jean Lave and Etienne Wenger, refers to the overall set of various types of informal, emergent social networks that facilitate information exchange between individuals with practice-related goals. In other words, networks of practice range from communities of practice, where learning occurs, to electronic networks of practice (often referred to as virtual or electronic communities).

== Basic concepts ==
To further define the concept, firstly the term network implies a set of individuals who are connected through social relationships, whether they be strong or weak. Terms such as community tend to denote a stronger form of relationship, but networks refer to all networks of social relationships, be they weak or strong. Second, the term practice represents the substrate that connects individuals in their networks. The principal ideas are that practice implies the actions of individuals and groups when conducting their work, e.g., the practice of software engineers, journalists, educators, etc., and that practice involves interaction among individuals.

What distinguishes a network of practice from other networks is that the primary reason for the emergence of relationships within a network of practice is that individuals interact through information exchange in order to perform their work, asking for and sharing knowledge with each other. A network of practice can be distinguished from other networks that emerge due to other factors, such as interests in common hobbies or discussing sports while taking the same bus to work, etc. Finally, practice need not necessarily be restricted to include those within one occupation or functional discipline. Rather it may include individuals from a variety of occupations; thus, the term, practice, is more appropriate than others such as occupation.

As indicated above, networks of practice incorporate a range of informal, emergent networks, from communities of practice to electronic networks of practice. Following Lave and Wenger's original work (1991), Brown and Duguid proposed that communities of practice are a localized and specialized subset of networks of practice, typically consisting of strong ties linking individuals engaged in a shared practice who typically interact in face-to-face situations. At the opposite end of the spectrum are electronic networks of practice, which are often referred to as virtual or electronic communities and consist of weak ties. In electronic networks of practice, individuals may never get to know one another or meet face-to-face, and they generally coordinate through means such as blogs, electronic mailing lists, or bulletin boards.

== Distinguishing from formal workgroups such as project teams ==
In contrast to the use of formal controls to support knowledge exchange often used in formal workgroups, such as contractual obligation, organizational hierarchies, monetary incentives, or mandated rules, networks of practice promote knowledge flows along lines of practice through informal social networks. Therefore, one way to distinguish between networks of practice and workgroups created through formal organizational mandate is by the nature of the control mechanisms.

The second group of distinguishing properties refers to their composition. Networks of practice and formal work groups vary in terms of their size since networks of practice may range from a few select individuals to very large, open electronic networks consisting of thousands of participants while groups are generally smaller. They also vary in terms of who can participate. Workgroups and virtual teams typically consist of members who are formally designated and assigned. In contrast, networks of practice consist of volunteers without formal restrictions placed on membership.

Finally, networks of practice and formal work groups vary in terms of expectations about participation. In formal workgroups and virtual teams, participation is jointly determined and members are expected to achieve a specific work goal. Participation in communities of practice is jointly determined, such that individuals generally approach specific others for help. In electronic networks of practice, participation is individually determined; knowledge seekers have no control over who responds to their questions or the quality of the responses. In turn, knowledge contributors have no assurances that seekers will understand the answer provided or be willing to reciprocate the favor.

== See also ==
- Community of practice (CoP)
- Knowledge management
- Landscape of practice (LoP)
- Organizational learning
- Personal network
- Virtual community
- Virtual community of practice
- Virtual ethnography
