= Software engineering demographics =

Software engineers make up a significant portion of the global workforce. As of 2022, there are an estimated 26.9 million professional software engineers worldwide, up from 21 million in 2016.

== By country ==
=== United States ===
In 2023, there were an estimated 1.6 million professional software developers in North America. There are 166 million people employed in the US workforce, making software developers 0.96% of the total workforce.

==== Summary ====
Role	#	SE title	#	TE title	Ratio of SE to TE
Practitioners	611,900	Software engineers	1,157,020	Traditional engineers	53%
Managers	264,790	Computer and information systems managers	413,750	Engineering managers + construction managers	64%
Educators	16,495	Computer science (practical)	29,310	Engineering teachers	56%
Technicians	457,320	Computer programmers	516,170	Engineering technicians	88%

==== Software engineers vs. traditional engineers ====
The following two tables compare the number of software engineers (611,900 in 2002) versus the number of traditional engineers (1,157,020 in 2002).

There are another 1,500,000 people in system analysis, system administration, and computer support, many of whom might be called software engineers. Many systems analysts manage software development teams, and as analysis is an important software engineering role, many of them may be considered software engineers in the near future. This means that the number of software engineers may actually be much higher.

The number of software engineers declined by 5 to 10 percent from 2000 to 2002.

Code	Description	Number (2002)	Hourly pay (2002)		Annual salary (2002)		Number (2021)	Mean hourly pay (2021)	Mean annual salary (2021)
15-1031	Software eng., applications	356,760	$34.09	$35.48	$73,800	0.7 %			
15-1032	Software eng., systems software	255,040	$35.60	$36.46	$75,840	0.6 %			
17-2011	Aerospace engineers	74,210	$34.97	$35.63	$74,110	1.1 %	56,640	$ 59.12	$ 122,970
17-2021	Agricultural engineers	2,500	$24.38	$26.79	$55,730	2.9 %	1,120	$ 41.99	$ 87,350
17-2031	Biomedical engineers	7,130	$29.04	$30.97	$64,420	1.7 %	17,190	$ 48.57	$ 101,020
17-2041	Chemical engineers	32,110	$34.85	$36.06	$75,010	1.0 %	24,180	$ 58.58	$ 121,840
17-2051	Civil engineers	207,480	$28.88	$30.29	$63,010	0.4 %	304,310	$ 45.91	$ 95,490
17-2061	Computer hardware engineers	67,180	$34.69	$36.61	$76,150	1.1 %	73,750	$ 65.50	$ 136,230
17-2071	Electrical engineers	146,180	$32.78	$33.88	$70,480	0.4 %	186,020	$ 51.87	$ 107,890
17-2072	Electronics eng., exc. computer	126,020	$33.62	$34.43	$71,600	0.6 %	107,170	$ 55.53	$ 115,490
17-2081	Environmental engineers	45,720	$29.52	$30.50	$63,440	0.7 %	42,660	$ 48.18	$ 100,220
17-2111	Health and safety, exc. mining	34,160	$27.89	$28.77	$59,830	0.7 %	22,870	$ 47.93	$ 99,700
17-2112	Industrial engineers	151,760	$29.88	$30.57	$63,590	0.3 %	293,950	$ 45.77	$ 95,200
17-2121	Marine eng., naval architects	4,810	$32.04	$32.83	$68,280	2.2 %	7,380	$ 47.03	$ 97,820
17-2131	Materials engineers	22,780	$30.09	$30.92	$64,310	1.0 %	21,530	$ 49.02	$ 101,950
17-2141	Mechanical engineers	203,620	$30.23	$31.33	$65,170	0.4 %	278,240	$ 46.64	$ 97,000
17-2151	Mining and geological eng.	5,050	$29.70	$31.14	$64,770	2.4 %	7,370	$ 48.29	$ 100,450
17-2161	Nuclear engineers	15,180	$39.11	$39.57	$82,300	1.3 %	12,670	$ 58.54	$ 121,760
17-2171	Petroleum engineers	11,130	$40.08	$41.13	$85,540	1.4 %	22,100	$ 70.06	$ 145,720

==== Computer managers vs. construction and engineering managers ====
Computer and information system managers (264,790) manage software projects, as well as computer operations. Similarly, Construction and engineering managers (413,750) oversee engineering projects, manufacturing plants, and construction sites. Computer management is 64% the size of construction and engineering management.

Code	Description	Number	Hourly pay		Annual salary	
11-3021	Computer and information systems managers	264,790	$40.98	$43.48	$90,440	0.3%
11-9021	Construction managers	208,360	$30.53	$34.24	$71,210	0.7%
11-9041	Engineering managers	205,390	$43.71	$46.03	$95,750	0.3%

==== Software engineering educators vs. engineering educators ====
Most people working in the field of computer science, whether making software systems (software engineering) or studying the theoretical and mathematical facts of software systems (computer science), acquire degrees in computer science. According to the U.S. Bureau of Labor Statistics (May 2023 data), there were approximately 44,800 postsecondary computer science teachers and 50,300 engineering teachers, indicating that the computer science educator workforce is nearly 89% as large as that of engineering educators. The combined number of postsecondary chemistry (25,400) and physics (17,100) teachers totaled 42,500, slightly less than the number of computer science educators.

Code	Description	Number	Hourly pay		Annual salary	
25-1021	Computer science teachers, postsecondary	32,990	(4)	(4)	$55,330	1.1%
25-1032	Engineering teachers, postsecondary	29,310	(4)	(4)	$73,100	1.3%
25-1052	Chemistry teachers, postsecondary	17,670	(4)	(4)	$60,800	1.3%
25-1054	Physics teachers, postsecondary	11,940	(4)	(4)	$66,960	1.0

==== Other software and engineering roles ====
Code	Description	Number	Hourly pay		Annual salary	
15-1051	Computer systems analysts	467,750	$30.24	$31.20	$64,890	0.5%
15-1041	Computer support specialists	478,560	$18.80	$20.35	$42,320	0.5%
15-1061	Database administrators	102,090	$26.68	$28.41	$59,080	0.5%
15-1071	Network and computer systems administrators	232,560	$26.35	$27.70	$57,620	0.4%
15-1081	Network systems and data communications analysts	133,460	$28.09	$29.51	$61,390	0.6%
17-3011	Architectural and civil drafters	101,190	$17.95	$18.78	$39,060	0.6%
17-3012	Electrical and electronics drafters	35,470	$19.76	$21.16	$44,020	0.8%
17-3013	Mechanical drafters	68,280	$19.58	$20.71	$43,080	0.9%

==== Relation to IT demographics ====
Software engineers are part of the much larger software, hardware, application, and operations community. In 2000 in the U.S., there were about 680,000 software engineers and about 10,000,000 IT workers. As of early 2025, there are an estimated 47.2 million software developers worldwide, representing a 50% increase from 31 million in Q1 2022.

There are no numbers on testers in the BLS data.

=== India ===
There has been a healthy growth in the number of India's IT professionals over the past few years. From a base of 6,800 knowledge workers in 1985–86, the number increased to 522,000 software and services professionals by the end of 2001–02. It is estimated that out of these 528,000 knowledge workers, almost 170,000 are working in the IT software and services export industry; nearly 106,000 are working in the IT enabled services and over 230,000 in user organizations.

=== Australia ===
In May 2024, the Australian government reported that 169,300 Australians are employed as software and applications programmers, 17% of who are women. The role grew annually by 8,300 workers.

=== Russia ===
According to the Russian government, the number of IT specialists in the country increased by 13% in 2023, reaching approximately 857,000. During the initial phase of the 2022 invasion of Ukraine, an estimated 100,000 IT specialists left Russia.

== See also ==
- Software engineering
- List of software engineering topics
- List of programming occupations
- Software engineering economics
- Software engineering professionalism
