= Certified software development professional =

Vendor-neutral professional certification

Certified Software Development Professional (CSDP)
- Established: 2002
- Website: computer.org/certification

Certified Software Development Professional (CSDP) is a vendor-neutral professional certification in software engineering developed by the IEEE Computer Society for experienced software engineering professionals. This certification was offered globally since 2001 through Dec. 2014.

The certification program constituted an element of the Computer Society's major efforts in the area of Software engineering professionalism, along with the IEEE-CS and ACM Software Engineering 2004 (SE2004) Undergraduate Curricula Recommendations, and The Guide to the Software Engineering Body of Knowledge (SWEBOK Guide 2004), completed two years later.

As a further development of these elements, to facilitate the global portability of the software engineering certification, since 2005 through 2008 the International Standard ISO/IEC 24773:2008 "Software engineering -- Certification of software engineering professionals -- Comparison framework" has been developed. (Please, see an overview of this ISO/IEC JTC 1 and IEEE standardization effort in the article published by Stephen B. Seidman, CSDP. ) The standard was formulated in such a way, that it allowed to recognize the CSDP certification scheme as basically aligned with it, soon after the standard's release date, 2008-09-01. Several later revisions of the CSDP certification were undertaken with the aim of making the alignment more complete. In 2019, ISO/IEC 24773:2008 has been withdrawn and revised (by ISO/IEC 24773-1:2019).

The certification was initially offered by the IEEE Computer Society to experienced software engineering and software development practitioners globally in 2001 in the course of the certification examination beta-testing. The CSDP certification program has been officially approved in 2002. After December 2014 this certification program has been discontinued, all issued certificates are recognized as valid forever. A number of new similar certifications were introduced by the IEEE Computer Society, including the Professional Software Engineering Master (PSEM) and Professional Software Engineering Process Master (PSEPM) Certifications (the later soon discontinued).

To become a Certified Software Development Professional (CSDP) candidates had to have four years (initially six years) of professional software engineering experience, pass a three-and-half-hour, 180-question examination on various knowledge areas of software engineering, and possess at least a bachelor's degree in Computer Science or Software Engineering. The CSDP examination tested candidates' proficiency in internationally accepted, industry-standard software engineering principles and practices. CSDP credential holders are also obligated to adhere to the IEEE/ACM's Software Engineering Code of Ethics and Professional Practice.

As of 2021, the IEEE-CS offer which is a successor to CSDP is the Professional Software Engineering Master (PSEM) certification. The exam is three hours, is proctored remotely, and consists of 160 questions over the 11 SWEBOK knowledge areas: Software Requirements, Software Design, Software Construction, Software Testing, Software Maintenance, Software Configuration Management, Software Engineering Management, Software Engineering Process, Software Engineering Models and Methods, Software Quality, Software Engineering Economics.

(There is also the Professional Software Developer (PSD) certification, which covers only 4 knowledge areas: software requirements, software design, software construction, and software testing. The similarity of the name of this certification to the CSDP is confusing, it is a reputable credential but NOT an equivalent of CSDP.)

== History ==
The IEEE Computer Society introduced the CSDP in 2002, and on October 27, 2008, it became the first certification to conform to ISO/IEC 24773 standard for software engineering certification.)

== Determination of eligibility ==
Candidates had to undergo a peer review of their education and professional qualifications in order to receive authorization to take the CSDP examination. Candidates therefore had to submit an application to the IEEE Computer Society that provided verifiable information regarding their educational background and professional experience.

The Certified Software Development Associate (CSDA) certification was available to graduating students and early-career software professionals who did not meet the eligibility requirements for the CSDP.

== CSDP examination content ==
The CSDP examination content was based on the Guide To The Software Engineering Body of Knowledge. The examination covered content from all primary knowledge areas in the SWEBOK Guide Version 3. Below is a list of the topics tested in terms of their proportion of the total examination.

- Software requirements 11%
- Software design 11%
- Software construction 9%
- Software testing 11%
- Software maintenance 5%
- Software configuration management 5%
- Software engineering management 8%
- Software engineering process 5%
- Software engineering methods 4%
- Software quality 7%
- Software engineering professional practice 5%
- Software engineering economics 5%
- Computing foundations 5%
- Mathematical foundations 3%
- Engineering foundations 4%
