= Special Education Bulgaria =

Organization of education professionals and parents

Special Education Bulgaria (SEB) (Bulgarian: Специална Педагогика България) is a community of practice, a professional community, for special education professionals and the parents of students with special needs throughout Bulgaria.

SEB was developed by researchers from Sofia University, Bulgaria and the University of Wollongong, Australia. The purpose of the SEB website is to facilitate the community of practice. It is hoped that such a community will help reduce the sense of isolation felt by young special education teachers and other special education stakeholders in rural areas of Bulgaria. The community is also intended to support special education stakeholders who are separated from their support network across busy cities or by the requirements of daily living.
