= Duality (CoPs) =

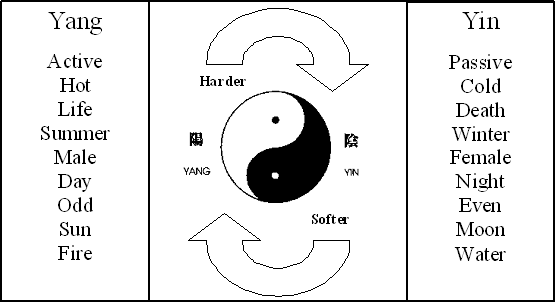
Adaptation of the taijitu symbol for yin and yang by Hildredth & Kimble (2002).

In a community of practice, duality refers to a tension between two forces which become a driving force for change and creativity. Wenger uses the concept of dualities to examine the forces that create and sustain a community of practice. He describes a duality as "a single conceptual unit that is formed by two inseparable and mutually constitutive elements whose inherent tensions and complementarity give the concept richness and dynamism".

Some compare the concept of a duality to that of yin and yang, i.e. two mutually defining opposites.

The term "duality" implies dynamic, continual change and mutual adjustment as the tensions that are inherent in dualities can be both creative and constraining. Four dualities emerge in communities of practice: participation–reification, designed–emergent, identification–negotiability and local–global.

== Participation and reification ==
The participation–reification duality is concerned with meaning, which is created through participation and active involvement in some practice. Reification is a way of making an abstract and concise representation of what is often a complex and messy practice, thus making it easier to share within the community. Because of its links to knowledge management, the participation-reification duality has been a particular area of focus in this field.

== Designed and emergent ==
The designed–emergent duality focuses on time and captures the tension between pre-planned and emergent activities. Designers can plan an activity that is designed to achieve a particular purpose however, some activities emerge through interaction and participation of the community; these are unplanned and may be contrary to what the designers intended. These give participants the opportunity to (re)negotiate existing meaning. The designed–emergent duality is often mentioned in relation to the design of on-line learning environments.

== Identification and negotiability ==
The identification–negotiability duality is concerned with "how the power to define, adapt, or interpret the design is distributed". Identification is the process through which individuals develop their identities. This includes how individuals perceive themselves and their right to contribute to and shape the direction of a community as a whole. Thus, this duality serves to combine both power and belonging in the shaping of the community.

== Local and global ==
The local–global duality concerns how one CoP relates to another. The challenge is to share local knowledge that meets the needs of a particular domain in a way that is relevant to others who are not involved in it. Wenger uses the notion of a boundary object, brokerage and boundary encounters to explain how individuals can establish relationships and learn from other communities.

== See also ==
- Force-field analysis
- Two-factor models of personality

== Bibliography ==
- Lave, Jean; Wenger, Etienne (1991). Situated Learning: Legitimate Peripheral Participation. Cambridge: Cambridge University Press. ISBN 0-521-42374-0.
- Mayer, Bernard S. (2015). The Conflict Paradox: Seven Dilemmas at the Core of Disputes (1st ed.). San Francisco: Jossey-Bass. ISBN 9781118852910. OCLC 890310229.
