= CSDP (disambiguation) =

CSDP usually refers to the Common Security and Defence Policy of the European Union (EU). CSDP may also refer to:

== Organisations ==
- Czech Social Democratic Party, a social-democratic political party in the Czech Republic
- Chinese Social Democratic Party, a political party in Taiwan founded by Ju Gau-jeng
- Center for the Study of Democratic Politics at the Woodrow Wilson School of Public and International Affairs, Princeton University
- Center for Studying Disability Policy, a research affiliate of Mathematica Policy Research
- Common Sense for Drug Policy, a think tank founded by American lawyer Kevin Zeese

== Other ==
- Certified Software Development Professional, an ISO-accredited professional certification in software engineering offered by the IEEE Computer Society
- Certified Sustainable Development Planner, a professional certification offered by the World Institute of Sustainable Development Planners
- Conceptual schema design procedure, an object-role modeling process

== See also ==
- CSD Pakistan (Canteen Stores Department Pakistan), retail store chain
