= Civil Engineering Body of Knowledge =

Body of knowledge proposal for civil engineering

The Civil Engineering Body of Knowledge is a body of knowledge, set forth in a proposal by the American Society of Civil Engineers (ASCE) entitled Civil Engineering Body of Knowledge for the 21st century. This proposal seeks to identify and implement improvements to the education and licensure process for civil engineers in the United States of America. The proposal is intended to increase occupational closure by increasing the requirements to become a licensed engineer. Some have identified this joint effort with the Raising the Bar as not necessary.

== History ==
Civil engineering as a profession has long studied and evaluated issues associated with educational preparation for the practice of its profession and to that end, engineering societies have held conferences and prepared reports on the subject since 1918.

=== Carnegie Foundation for the Advancement of Teaching (1918) ===
The first systematic efforts to evaluate and improve engineering curricula began in 1907 when the Society for the Promotion of Engineering Education or SPEE, presently the American Society for Engineering Education (ASEE). The Society invited several engineering societies, including the American Society of Civil Engineers to participate in a "Joint Committee on Engineering Education of the National Engineering Societies". The committee's objective was to determine the appropriate scope of engineering education and the degree of cooperation required from the various engineering schools. In 1908, the committee initially invited the Carnegie Foundation for the Advancement of Teaching and the General Education Board to appoint delegates. Notwithstanding financial assistance from ASCE, the committee approached the Foundation to assume the project and fully fund a comprehensive report. Carnegie agreed and selected Charles R. Mann (1869-1942) professor of physics at the University of Chicago. to lead the effort to prepare the 1918 formal report. Mann recommended that knowledge and practice be equal parts of the engineering curriculum with principles of engineering distilled from practice and science and mechanics taught simultaneously. These concepts, first advanced in the early part of the 20th century, remain the "...general organization of most engineering education today." Foreshadowing the emergence of the total quality management initiative, Mann argued that "the ultimate success of any organization depends on ... the manner in which those in control coordinate and interrelate the intelligences and imaginations of men. Further, Mann claimed that engineering education was in need of "...a healthy dose of managerial and humanistic courses..."

=== Board of Investigation and Coordination (BIC) (1923-1929) ===
Starting with Mann report recommendations, the Society for the Promotion of Engineering Education or SPEE again organized a study on examining the results of efforts to standardize and otherwise increase the efficacy of engineering education conducted by a newly formed but temporary Board of Investigation and Coordination (BIC) supported by formal arrangements with over 150 colleges and universities, nearly every engineering institution of that time. Again, the Carnegie Foundation for the Advancement of Teaching provided assistance along with support from the American Society of Civil Engineers and other engineering societies, the effort resulted in a seven year effort and final report- "Report of the investigation of Engineering Education (1923-1929)"

The report dealt with two separate but very much related issues in engineering education; separate versus unified undergraduate/graduate education and the length of this engineering education. The report noted that a unified process implies in a 21st-century context is that the undergraduate and graduate engineering curriculums are complete and self-contained under the direction of a single engineering department. A divided education process implies that there is a distinct, pre-professional education stage such as that practiced by the medical, legal and dental professions The Board in 1930 found that the needs of the engineering profession was best served by allowing secondary school graduates to directly enter the engineering curriculum and this should be the norm of engineering education. This meant that unlike the unified approach to engineering education, medical, legal and dental education programs were divided and could only be entered after a distinct and separate, undergraduate education process not managed by the profession. As to the question of the appropriate length of the engineering curriculum, the Board recommended staying with the "usual distinction between undergraduate and graduate programs where the undergraduate degree was an accredited engineering degree of fours years as the normal length (unified process). This 1930 recommendation by the BIC became the standard discipline organization for civil engineering education in specially accredited institutions: the four-year bachelor's of science degree in civil engineering or BSCE with optional graduate school coursework for advanced skills and methods, the masters of science in civil engineering, or MSCE degree. The objective of the engineering curriculum was to integrate humanistic, scientific and technological studies into a coherent program of study which is different than a degree in science by virtue of "... a well-marked professional orientation".

The 1930 Board report also discussed the "normal path to progress" taken by engineering graduates. The Board observed that industry was less inclined to emphasize differences between engineering disciplines and more inclined to focus on the distinction between discipline activities such as design from management activities. The Board noted even in the 1920s, a clear trend where graduates would work on technical activities in the early part of their career and then work on increasing percentage of what was then termed administrative activity and implicitly by today's standards, management activity.

=== Accreditation Board for Engineering and Technology (ABET) Accreditation and National Council of Examiners for Engineering and Surveying (NCEES) Licensing ===
While reforms were being made in civil engineering education, concerns were being expressed over licensing engineering practice over self-regulation by the Societies themselves. By 1910, the civil engineering society accepted and supported the concept of State licensure of engineering practice. In 1920, the National Council of State Boards of Engineering Examiner, currently known as the National Council of Examiners for Engineering and Surveying (NCEES) was organized to promote fair licensure for engineers in the United States, help enforce such licensure regulations. and determine and administer appropriate levels of experience and education for professional practice and still does in the current period. In 1932, working with other engineering societies and educators such as ASCE and ASEE, the Council organized the Engineers' Council for Professional Development or ECPD. Formal accreditation by the ECPD of engineering curricula began in 1936. ECPD grew and in 1980, changed its name to Accreditation Board for Engineering and Technology (ABET) and focus solely to accreditation of engineering education programs.

=== ASCE Education Conferences (1960-1995) ===
ASCE conducted its first engineering education conference in 1960 at Ann Arbor, Michigan. The first of six conferences on this topic over the next 35 years. The conference attendees resolved the earlier BIC recommendation of four years as the curriculum norm be changed to a five-year undergraduate degree in civil engineering. A 1968 joint study between ASCE and ASEE resulted in a report entitled "Goals of Engineering Education" advocated for one more year of engineering education in the form of one year of graduate level coursework. Accreditation partner, ABET experimented with dual-level accreditation where basic programs were four years in length and advanced criteria for additional undergraduate coursework. Twenty-percent of ABET's civil engineering programs requested such dual-level accreditation. Despite the initial interest, the five year undergraduate programs had a difficult time competing against the four year programs for the same bachelor's degree of science in civil engineering and ABET dropped dual-accreditation by the mid-1980s.

==== Civil Engineering Education Conference (CEEC 95) ====
By 1995, the effort was again made to address the question of curriculum length as a norm. Questions at this point were again on curriculum integration but also that of the first professional degree. A professional degree, formerly known in the US as a "first professional degree", is a degree that prepares someone to work in a particular profession such as civil engineering and meets the minimum academic requirements for licensure or accreditation. The preparation for the 1995 conference focused on four topics: technical competence, communication skills, management concepts and teamwork. This was a clear recognition of weaknesses in curriculum content as one observer remarked -"an engineer is hired for his or her technical skills, fired for poor people skills and promoted for leadership and management skills." The question was raised why recreate elementary coursework in fields such as economics or management. Attendees noted that educators must balance depth versus breadth in developing engineering curricula. With management as an example, it was noted that students can take management instruction in any number of non-engineering environments but it was important for an engineering education program to possess a design that ensured all graduates acquired a "particular base of knowledge." One of the authors (Walesh) noted that one of the biggest problems faced by consulting engineers was poor project management and how few in academia recognized the importance of "effective project management on the survival of an engineering firm...". Noting the increased importance of management in civil engineering practice in the 21st century, the Conference stated that civil engineers must have a larger skillset than their counterparts in the 1920s with respect to knowledge in communication, teamwork and project management. This Conference then, laid the conceptual framework for looking at specialized applications of management within civil engineering curricula such as engineering management, design management construction management and project management.

Conferees reported out from the conference on proposed initiatives, barriers and recommended actions in eight areas, namely: faculty development, communication skills, project management, teamwork and leadership, project based learning, practitioner participation, pre-professional and professional degrees and implementation of National Science Foundation recommendation for engineering education.

- In the area of faculty development, the Conference recommended requiring technical competence, project management, practical experience, communication skills and leadership ability for program faculty.
- For Communication skills, the recommendations were to invite industry speakers to emphasize the importance of communication skills, students engineering communications portfolio to display their skills.
- For Project Management which the Conference defined as a function performed on a specific project in which an organization has defined responsibilities and can be composed of a variety of tasks in the "... planning, design, construction, and operation and maintenance phases of a constructed facility...", work with interested faculty to get appropriate training as well as for the civil engineering profession to develop additional educational materials as one of the barriers to success on this item was a lack of suitable instruction materials. Specifically, participants suggested tasking ASCE's Engineering Management Division to develop instructional materials for separate engineering management coursework or individual instructional modules for technical competencies.
- In the area of integrated and interdisciplinary curriculum systems or Project-Based Learning, recommendations in part were to "develop and disseminate a database of case ...(studies)..."; encourage ASCE's practitioner members to become more engaged in the educational process; ASCE and NSF should develop and promote teaching models and workshops to foster educator-practitioner partnerships.
- As to Practitioner Participation in Education, the conference recommended that practitioners serving on department advisory committees and assist in the development of learning outcomes for instruction programs, practitioners to serve as sources of case study data materials and analysis, promote educator and practitioner-in-residence programs with possible CEU credits, support co-op and internship opportunities.
- With respect to Pre-professional and Professional Degrees, the Conference recommended delineating engineering education from the engineering technology education curricula.

=== Task Committee on Civil Engineering Education Initiatives (TCCEEJ) 1995-1998 ===
Formed out of recommendations from the CEEC 95 conference, the committee was chartered to investigate four areas: faculty development; integrated curriculums; practitioner involvement in the education process and the adoption of the master's degree as the first professional degree necessary to enable practice of civil engineering. The basis for the 1995 recommended change was the existence of a well developed and diverse group of graduate civil engineering programs that did not exist in the 1920s and 1930s when the earlier BIC had worked. Whereas, the 1930 BIC recommended no changes to the typical undergraduate and graduate engineering programs, the 1995 Task Committee recommended that the master's degree of science in civil engineering be recognized as the "first professional degree" to be recognized for professional practice. The committee also noted that this also required instruction in the principles of project management. Ultimately, the Committee recommendation to ASCE in 1998 was that the "first professional degree" become the new paradigm of engineering education, replacing the earlier BIC model from 1930. That same year, ASCE formalized the recommendations in a policy statement saying that ASCE supported the concept of "...the master's degree as the First Professional Degree (FPD) for the practice of civil engineering (CE) at the professional level." Thus, the impetus for the development and adoption of ASCE's Policy 465 in 1998 can be traced directly to the 1995 ASCE Education Conference held in Denver, CO, USA.

This proposed change was not widely accepted within the civil engineering profession

=== Task Committee for the First Professional Degree (1999-2001) ===
In 1999, ASCE then organized the Task Committee for the First Professional Degree and instructed it to develop an implementation strategy for ASCE's new vision and policy. The new task committee reported back in 2001 that although the earlier recommendations and adopted policy had been focused on graduate education, the committee recommended developing a holistic picture of prerequisite requirements for formal education. In this manner, it had identified the fundamental issue as the increasing inadequacy of the four year bachelor's degree as "... formal academic preparation for the practice of civil engineering at the professional level in the 21st century." The report cited examples of this were inadequate communication skills, inability to manage projects profitably and failure to meet stakeholder expectations among others. It also noted that a lack of education in leadership to support the current prevalent career path of "...starting from primarily technical work through project management and into management and leadership." There was an intense competition for desired leadership positions that was shared in common with other engineering disciplines, as well as from non-engineers. The best example of this is in project management which requires better educated civil engineers. In the case of the latter, more and more non-engineers are managing "...civil engineers with the principal reason being that the non-engineers possess stronger leadership, communication and business skills...." and leadership positions with titles such as Director of Public Works, Chief Engineer, City Engineer, Secretary of Transportation, etc. are now being filled by non-engineers "...possessing skills which are perceived to be of greater value than those of a typical engineer."

In order to fully implement its vision of civil engineering, the committee recommended that the policy focus on the core principle that

(A)dmission to the practice of civil engineering at the professional level occurs at licensure and requires a body of specialized knowledge as reflected by a combination of a baccalaureate degree and a master's degree or equivalent, appropriate experience, and a commitment to lifelong learning. (The reference to "specialized body of knowledge" later become the Civil Engineering body of knowledge.)

The committee's report in addition to strategies also included recommendations for an implementation plan consisting of four major action items to implement the ASCE policy over the next twenty years:

- Continuous interaction with other stakeholders such as NCEES and ABET.
- Work with licensing jurisdictions to adopt the ASCE policy for a combination of a baccalaureate degree and a master's degree or equivalent, appropriate experience as a prerequisite for licensure. Part of that action item also encouraged the use of licensed civil engineers to manage civil engineering projects, implicitly civil infrastructure. (Task 8)
- Encourage ASCE practice institutes to promote the development of speciality certifications and encourage civil engineering's stakeholders to require participation of such certified engineers on projects.

=== Committee on Academic Prerequisites for Professional Practice (2001-2004) ===
In 2001, ASCE accepted the 1999 task committee recommendations on policy. ASCE also organized the Committee on Academic Prerequisites for Professional Practice on a temporary or task basis and charged it to "...develop, organize, and execute a detailed plan for the full implementation of the policy statement." In 2003, ASCE changed the committee from a task basis to a standing committee; acknowledging the effort will take many years. The 1999 committee had in fact recommended a 20-year timeframe. This is committee was also charged in 2003 with implementing another ASCE initiative, "Raise the bar". In 2004, the committee recommended changing the policy to reflect the society's belief that the body of knowledge necessary to practice of civil engineering at the professional level includes the "...knowledge, skills, and attitudes necessary to be a licensed professional civil engineer." ASCE accepted those recommendations and in 2004 and modified its policy to state that "the attainment of a body of knowledge for entry into the practice of civil engineering at the professional level" .

=== ASCE Vision of Civil Engineering in 2025 (2007) ===
In 2006, the American Society of Civil Engineers convened a "Summit on the Future of Civil Engineering" in response to concerns for the future of the civil engineering profession. This "...highly-varied group of civil engineers, engineers from other disciplines, architects, educators, association and society executives, and other leaders, including participants from eight countries outside the United States..." conceived of and developed its vision for civil engineers practicing in the global economy, in the year 2025 and then produced a report documenting that vision. Their purpose was to produce an aspirational vision that addressed "... all levels and facets of the civil engineering community, that is, professional (licensed) civil engineers, non-licensed civil engineers, technologists, and technicians." The aspirational vision produced was a civil engineering profession that was "(e)ntrusted by society to create a sustainable world and enhance the global quality of life, civil engineers serve competently, collaboratively, and ethically ..." These civil engineers would practice using "...widely recognized and valued knowledge ... (and) ... skills" and attitudes. Accomplishing this aspirational vision required these future professionals to possess attributes such as formal education, work experience, and professional achievement and attitudes supportive of orchestrating "... solutions to society's most pressing current needs while helping to create a more viable future." In this vision, civil engineers function as "... planners, designers, constructors, and operators of society's economic and social engine—the built environment..." The only way to accomplish that was for the engineering profession to agree on "...a vision, transform engineering education, present engineers as broad-based technology leaders, accommodate innovations from non-engineering fields, and become more interdisciplinary." This vision also recognized an increasing requirement for the application of project management in civil engineering project due to increasing complexity and stakeholder expectations with respect to project delivery.

In discussing these future aspirations, the report also acknowledged the past efforts to reform engineering education noting that there had been "...broad changes to the academic prerequisites to professional practice..." where future civil engineers must provide evidence of competency with "...the appropriate body of knowledge through education and experience." The Summit report in conclusion observed that ASCE's civil engineering body of knowledge was now widely accepted and more importantly, would form the basis for establishing the requirements for formal education and pre-licensure experience for civil engineers.

The National Society of Professional Engineers (NSPE) issued its Engineering Body of Knowledge (EBOK) in 2013.

=== Engineering Competency Model (2015) ===
The U.S. Department of Labor (DOL) in cooperation with the American Association of Engineering Societies (AAES), issued its first edition of its Engineering Competency Model (ECM) in 2015. These reports were five or more years after the Second Edition or (CEBOK2). The Engineering Competency Model outlined "...engineering knowledge, skills, and abilities (not attitudes) collectively referred to as competencies." The model is depicted in the form of a pyramid with tiers of knowledge. Although the arrangement of the tiers was not intended to be hierarchical, nor to necessarily imply some skill sets were higher than others. "Instead, the model's tapered shape represents the increasing specialization and specificity of proficiencies covered. Its tiers are further divided into blocks that represent competency areas (i.e., groups of knowledge, skills, and abilities), which are defined using critical work functions and technical content." These DOL engineering competencies were not meant to be discipline specific, nor linked to specific stages of professionals development or education and importantly, do not recognize licensure as a step to professional practice. Competency models such as the ECM produced by the Department of Labor communicate a vision of business and industry requirements essential for the "...development of curriculum, skill assessment instruments, and certifications. " The Engineering Competency Model as developed by the DOL "...identifies the knowledge, skills, and abilities needed for workers to perform successfully in the field of engineering." One commentator noted that the CEBOK2 lacked coverage in seven areas; namely, "...Client/Stakeholder Focus, Creative Thinking, Engineering Economics, Manufacturing and Construction, Operations and Maintenance, Quality Control and Quality Assurance, and Safety."

== Civil Engineering Body of Knowledge (CEBoK) ==
ASCE recognized in the 1999 Committee's work that a body of specialized knowledge was required for the practice of civil engineering. This body of professional knowledge had four components: a technical and non-technical core knowledge elements, technical knowledge electives, and technical and non-technical learning to support an individual's career objectives. Creating a body of knowledge for the civil engineering profession was as complicated as any mega-project a civil engineer might attempt.

== Current status ==
In the United States, the body of knowledge necessary to obtain a license to practice engineering is defined by the laws or regulations of each state or territory. Most states have a standard that is a four-step process. First, an individual must obtain a Bachelor's degree from a university program that is accredited by the Accreditation Board for Engineering and Technology. A two-step examination process administered by the National Council of Examiners for Engineering and Surveying must be completed. The first eight-hour test is the Fundamentals of Engineering exam; the second, also eight hours long, is the Principles and Practice of Engineering exam. The other step is to work an apprenticeship, usually of four years in length, under an already-licensed engineer. The second exam is generally the fourth and final step; the fundamentals exam can be taken before or after the apprenticeship in most states.

The first state to regulate the practice of engineering was Wyoming in 1907. After that, ASCE established a model law for licensure. The last state to pass licensure laws for engineers was Montana.

Many states now require continuing education to maintain a license to practice engineering. In 1979, Iowa became the first. Since then about half of the states have added continuing education to their engineering laws.

== Content the BOK ==
The body of knowledge defines twenty-four outcomes that make up the knowledge, skills and attitudes necessary to practice civil engineering. The outcomes are divided into three categories: foundational, technical, and professional, foundation, technical and professional. The body of knowledge uses Bloom's Taxonomy to outline the necessary level of achievement for each of the twenty-four outcomes.

== Implementation status ==
ASCE has formed the BOK Educational Fulfillment Committee (BOKEdFC) to focus on self-proposed changes that the professional organization believes needs to be made to engineering education. This committee is composed of representatives from universities with four-year civil engineering programs.

NCEES considered the implementation of the BOK at their 2008 annual meeting and decided to establish a task force. The task force is provide an analysis of "(1) the potential educational, professional, regulatory, and economic impact of the master's or equivalent; and (2) any alternative solutions besides the master's or equivalent that could potentially address the challenge of better preparing engineering licensure candidates to enter the profession."

In 2008, Nebraska became the first to consider legislation requiring college-level education beyond the bachelor's degree as a requirement for a professional engineering license. The legislation was not enacted, in part to testimony from engineering associations. The Nebraska section of the American Council of Engineering Companies stated that the new requirement might have made it more difficult for companies located in their state to hire and keep entry-level engineers.
