= Virtual community of practice =

A virtual community of practice (VCoP), also known as an online community of practice (OCoP), is a community of practice (CoP) that is developed and maintained on the Internet. OCoPs include active members who are practitioners, or "experts," in the specific domain of interest. Members participate in a process of collective learning within their domain. Community social structures are created to assist in knowledge creation and sharing, which is negotiated within an appropriate context. Community members learn through both instruction-based learning and group discourse. Finally, multiple dimensions facilitate the long-term management of support and the ability for synchronous interactions.

To some, a VCoP is a misnomer because the original concept of a CoP was based around situated learning in a co-located setting. With increasing globalization and the growth of the Internet, many now claim that virtual CoPs exist. For example, some claim that a wiki (such as Wikipedia) is a virtual CoP, whereas others argue that the essence of a community is place-based – a community of place.

There is also debate on the term VCoP because the form of communication is largely computer-mediated. Few believe that a community of practice may be formed without face-to-face meetings, with many leading CoP researchers stressing the importance of in-person meetings. However, some researchers argue that a VCoP's high use of community technology changes some of its characteristics and introduces new complexities and ambiguities, thus justifying the term VCoP and its area of study.

Other similar terms include: online, computer-mediated, electronic and distributed. As the mode of communication can involve face-to-face, telephone and letter, and the defining feature is its distributed nature. Virtual Learning Communities (VLCs) are distinct from Distributed Communities of Practice (DCoP). Similar to a VCoP, a "mobile community of practice" (MCoP) forms when members primarily engage in a community of practice using mobile phones.

Research suggests that increases in the sharing of tacit knowledge, which occurs within communities of practice, may take place in VCoPs, albeit to a lesser degree.

== Online communities of practice ==
Communities of practice involve a group of people with shared interests or goals who participate within the community. Online communities of practice can include affinity groups or forums. Community members provide and function as resources for new members by supporting new members in developing and participating in shared activities.

Some researchers argue that virtual communities necessitate a different conceptualization of community, and that technology stewardship is a key element of virtual communities of practice by making virtual communities independent of any one technology.

== Current research ==
Research suggests that through extended connections, reflections, and online discourse, OCoPs can support the growth of a collective community identity. OCoPs provide a virtual space for people who might otherwise never meet, in which they can collaborate and participate in shared activities related to the group's interests and goals. Additionally, people who are engaged in emergent and uncommon practices, or who have few local resources may have a lower barrier of entry for becoming members of online communities. By participating in community practices, both experienced and novice practitioners can learn together and as a community, which also shapes the personal identities of the members and the group's collective identity. Virtual Communities of Practice may be especially effective for increasing teacher efficacy and reducing professional isolation in computer science education.

Some questions remain as to what level of participation in an online community constitutes legitimate membership of an OCoP. Two types of participation have been identified to distinguish between levels of activity. Active participation means that members regularly contribute to community discourse. Peripheral participation, also called “lurking,” means that members read without contributing. Some studies have concluded that some degree of peripheral participation is expected in online communities. Though these members may not contribute to the community discourse, they nevertheless learn from observing, which some researchers would characterize as legitimate membership. Some researchers raise concerns that peripheral participation can threaten an OCoP if more members lurk than actively participate.

== Social networking ==
Web 2.0 applications and social networks have increased the ease by which OCoPs are created and maintained.

The structural characteristics of a community of practice include a shared domain of interest, a notion of community, and members who are also practitioners. While Internet applications may incorporate one of these characteristics, they may not support a full community in practice.

Social networks allow for the creation of clearly defined domains of interest in which the interactions between people can support communities with common and recorded histories. Social network tools allow members of OCoPs to create and share knowledge and develop cultural historical processes.

== Advantages ==
An online community of practice enables participants to read, submit and receive feedback from the community. Peripheral participants (lurkers) can still develop the knowledge and skills from communal resources that are necessary for novice practitioners. Veteran community members support novices, resulting in an atmosphere of mentorship. As new practitioners develop their understanding and expertise, they can participate in expanding the community's field of knowledge.

The asynchronous nature of many online forums (e.g. blogs, wikis) allows participants to be involved at their convenience. The forums maintain a record of ideas, discourse and resources, creating an archive of expertise for a field of practice that can be accessed at any time from nearly anywhere.

Professionals who work alone or are the only person from their field of practice in a work setting have indicated a reduced sense of isolation after participating in an OCoP. The contributions of the group help identify characteristics of a practitioner, resulting in both a sense of the overall community's identity and the individual's identity within the group.

== Disadvantages ==
=== Organizational Impact ===
Establishing a VCoP within an existing organization may disrupt the organization's social, cultural, and political systems through questioning. Change management strategies might mitigate this disruption through different stages of a VCoP's development.

=== Technology ===
A common hindrance to participation in online communities of practice is the required technology. Members who lack access to computers, PDAs or similar web-accessing technology are precluded from participating in an OCoP. Members with slow or unreliable equipment are unable to participate to their full potential and may find the technical difficulties so discouraging they withdraw completely. Likewise, the technical aptitude required to participate online can be daunting to individuals unfamiliar with the software or platform being used.

=== Forums ===
The lack of physical identification and body language in text-only forums can make it difficult to foster meaningful connections between members. Without a sense of connectivity with other practitioners, involvement may falter. Moderators of an OCoP forum may strengthen the OCoP through activities, events, and occasions in order to promote involvement. Individuals who return after a period of non-participation may feel overwhelmed or discouraged by the amount of new information and posts.

=== Diversity of participants ===
The varying levels of knowledge, skill and experience within an OCoP can deter less confident members from participating in the community. The diverse nature of a community can also create linguistic and cultural barriers to participation. Discourse and jargon can create confusion and misunderstanding, and clarifying communication errors online can prove difficult.

== Examples of online collaborative tools ==
Online tools are the means for collaboration between individuals who may be located across the globe. They may include online tools specifically developed to address the needs of communities of practice or other types of tools used for OCoPs.

=== Social networking sites ===
The first social network site (SNS), SixDegrees.com, was created in 1997. Examples of social networking sites include:

- LinkedIn
- Facebook
- MySpace

=== Virtual worlds ===
Virtual worlds, which are online community-based environments, are being used in both educational and professional settings. In education, these virtual worlds are used to communicate information and allow for face-to-face virtual interaction between students and teachers. They also allow students to use resources provided by the teacher in both the physical and virtual classroom. In professional environments, virtual training provides virtual visits to company locations, as well as flexible training that can be converted from in-person classroom to online virtual content. Virtual worlds provide training simulations for what could otherwise be hazardous situations.

Companies are using virtual worlds to exchange information and ideas. In addition, virtual worlds are used for technical support and business improvements. Case studies document how virtual worlds provide teamwork and training simulations that otherwise be inaccessible. Examples of virtual worlds include:

- Second Life
- Whyville

=== Information sharing ===
Online tools are available for sharing information, which can be used to communicate thoughts or ideas, and provide a setting necessary for collaborative knowledge building. Activities associated with these tools can be integrated into the presentation of online classroom and/or training materials.

Examples of tools for information sharing include:

- Wikis
- Google Docs
- Blogs

=== Decision making ===
Online tools and platforms can also support deliberation and voting. These may be used by political organizations such as Podemos. Examples of tools and platforms include:

- Loomio
- Reddit
- Appgree
- Agora Voting

== See also ==
- Community of practice
- Computer-supported collaborative learning
- Network of practice
- Online ethnography
- Online participation
- Virtual community
- Virtual team
- Virtual volunteering
