= Mutual engagement =

Mutual engagement occurs when people creatively spark together and enter a state of group flow. It involves engagement with both the products of a joint activity and with the other participants who are contributing to those products. Mutual engagement is essential for technologically mediated creative collaborations such as group improvisation with new musical interfaces, distributed brainstorming, and so on.

== Identifying mutual engagement ==
Mutual engagement is about the points at which participants engage with each other in a creative collaboration. These points may be indicated by co-location of contributions, mutual modification of the joint product, discussions of quality of the joint product, or repetition and reinterpretation of others' contributions. These rely on participants' skills and expertise with the system.

== Designing for mutual engagement ==
User interfaces designed for mutual engagement should support mutual awareness of actions, shared and consistent representations, mutual modifiability, and annotation.

== Related work ==
Mutual engagement is critical to creative collaborations which rely on technology. The field of computer supported cooperative work is closely related, but focusses more on work, task, and office based activities. Wenger's characterization of mutual engagement in a community of practice focuses on participants ability to "engage with other members and respond in kind to their actions". From Wenger's perspective, mutual engagement is about the work involved in learning how to interact with other people in an emerging community of practice whereas the definition given here is about informing design of collaborative user interfaces.
