= Information Systems Professional =

The Information Systems Professional (I.S.P), or Informaticien professionnel agréé (I.P.A. in French), is a professional designation issued by the Canadian Information Processing Society (CIPS). Introduced in 1989, the professional designation is recognised by legislation in most provinces of Canada. Before meeting the entry requirements for professional status an applicant may use the "Candidate Member I.S.P" designation.

CIPS has developed the Computer Science Accreditation Council (CSAC), and the Information Systems and Technology Accreditation Council (ISTAC) to accredit baccalaureate programs in Computer Science, Software Engineering, Management Information Systems, Computer Systems Technology, Applied Information Technology, and post-diploma type programs in Canada. These accredited programs combined with several years of experience lead to the I.S.P. designation.

== See also ==
- Fédération de l'informatique du Québec
