= Situated learning =

Theory of learning

Situated learning is a theory that explains an individual's acquisition of professional skills and includes research on apprenticeship into how legitimate peripheral participation leads to membership in a community of practice. Situated learning "takes as its focus the relationship between learning and the social situation in which it occurs".

The theory is distinguished from alternative views of learning which define learning as the acquisition of propositional knowledge. Lave and Wenger see situated learning in certain forms of social co-participation and instead of asking what kinds of cognitive processes and conceptual structures are involved, they focus on the kinds of social engagements that provide the proper context and facilitate learning.

== Overview ==
Situated learning was first proposed by Jean Lave and Etienne Wenger as a model of learning in a community of practice. At its simplest, situated learning is learning that takes place in the same context in which it is applied. For example, the workplace is considered as a discernible community of practice operating as a context wherein newcomers assimilate norms, behavior, values, relationships, and beliefs.

Lave and Wenger (1991) argues that learning is a social process whereby knowledge is co-constructed; they suggest that such learning is situated in a specific context and embedded within a particular social and physical environment.

Against the prevalent view of learning that involves the cognitive process in which individuals are respectively engaged in as learners, Lave and Wenger viewed learning as participation in the social world, suggesting learning as an integral and inseparable aspect of social practice. In their view, learning is the process by which newcomers become part of a community of practice and move toward full participation in it. Learners' participation in the community of practice always entails situated negotiation and renegotiation of meaning in the world. They understand and experience the world through the constant interactions by which they reconstruct their identity (i.e., becoming a different person) and evolve the form of their membership in the community as the relations between newcomers and old-timers who share the social practice change. In their view, motivation is situated because learners are naturally motivated by their growing value of participation and their desires to become full practitioners.

Lave and Wenger assert that situated learning "is not an educational form, much less a pedagogical strategy". However, since their writing, others have advocated different pedagogies that include experiential and situated activity:

- Workshops, kitchens, greenhouses and gardens used as classrooms
- Stand-up role playing in the real-world setting, including most military training (much of which, though, takes a behaviorist approach)
- Field trips including archaeological digs and participant-observer studies in an alien culture
- On the job training including apprenticeship and cooperative education
- Sports practice, music practice, and art are situated learning by definition, as the exact actions in the real setting are those of practice – with the same equipment or instruments

Many of the original examples from Lave and Wenger concerned adult learners, and situated learning still has a particular resonance for adult education. For example, Hansman shows how adult learners discover, shape, and make explicit their own knowledge through situated learning within a community of practice.

== History ==
In the 2003 article "The Nature of Situated Learning", Paula Vincini argued that "the theory behind situated learning or situated cognition arises from the fields of psychology, anthropology, sociology, and cognitive science." She summarized:

The seminal paper "Situated Cognition and the Culture of Learning" by John Seely Brown, Allan Collins, and Paul Duguid brought situated cognition to the forefront as an emerging instruction model. In this paper, the authors criticize public schooling for separating the "knowing and doing" and for treating knowledge "as an integral, self-sufficient substance, theoretically independent of the situations in which it is learned and used."
Other theorists (Jean Lave, Etienne Wenger, Lev Vygotsky, John Dewey, and J. G. Greeno) associated with situated learning theory argue that knowledge must be taught in context and not in the abstract. Learners must use tools as practitioners use them and become "cognitive apprentices" in that discipline's community and its culture.

In 1996 John R. Anderson et al. had traced back the origin of the concept to the "cognitive revolution" in the 1960s, They argued:

Following on the so-called "cognitive revolution" in psychology that began in the 1960s, education, and particularly mathematics and science education, has been acquiring new insights from psychology, and new approaches and instructional techniques based on these insights. At the same time, cognitive psychologists have been paying increasing attention to education as an area of application of psychological knowledge and as a source of important research problems. There is every reason to believe that as research in cognitive psychology progresses and increasingly addresses itself to educational issues, even closer and more productive links can be formed between psychology and mathematics education.
However, there is a tendency now to present all manner of educational opinion as bearing a stamp of approval from cognitive psychology.... as in many recent publications in mathematics education, much of what is described in that book reflects two movements, "situated learning" and "constructivism", which have been gaining influence on thinking about education and educational research.

Vincini (2003) continued to explain, that "the social interaction that occurs in communities of practice between experts and novices is crucial to the theory of situated cognition or learning. In Situated Learning: Legitimate Peripheral Participation, Lave and Wenger emphasize that novices begin learning by observing members of the community and then slowly move from the periphery of the community to fully participating members."

== Elements ==
Put in terms developed by William Rankin, the major elements in situated learning are content (facts and processes of a task), context (situations, values, environmental cues), and community (the group where the learner will create and negotiate). Situated learning also involves participation (where a learner works together with others in order to solve a problem).

Situated learning deals with how one's knowledge develops over the course of an activity and how they create and interpret.

Content: In situated learning, no importance is given to the retention of the content. Rather, situated learning stresses reflective and higher-order thinking where the results are used in solving problems faced in daily life. Situated learning is thus more application-based.

Context: Context provides a framework for the usage of the product or the result at the right time, place, and situation in the social, psychological and material environment. Context creates a platform to examine the learning experiences.

Community: Community helps the learner to create, interpret, reflect and form meanings. It provides opportunities to share experiences among learners and also to interact.

Participation: It is where the interchange of ideas, problem-solving and engagement of the learners take place. This takes place in a social setting which includes reflecting, interpreting, and negotiating among the participants of the community.

== Claims ==
Situated learning means to have a thought and action which is used at the right time and place. In this approach, the content is learned through doing activities. It is dilemma-driven, it challenges the intellectual and psychomotor skills of a learner. Situated learning contributes to bringing about the relationship between classroom situations and real-life situations outside the classroom. In adult classroom, the conditions are so created that it is complex and unclear, from which they gain experiences and they learn. There are four claims by Brown, Collins, and Dugid:

- Action is grounded in the concrete situations in which it occurs.
- Knowledge does not transfer between tasks.
- Training by abstraction is of little use.
- Learning is a social phenomenon.

== Implications of these claims for instruction ==
- To provide authenticated tasks in the learning environment: It is said that authenticated task involves two stages that are an objective and data in the setting also to the level of which students are performing the tasks which are authenticated.
- Simulated apprenticeship: Students can become apprentices in a given discipline by gaining knowledge and skills.
- Anchored instructions: It emphasizes the conditions laid by situated learning. It gives a situated context to solve the problem.
- Learning communities: Change of the classroom culture from more of knowledge supplying to a learning community where students focus on knowledge building and solve problems that they are interested in.
- Assessment in appropriate place: It shows an individual's performance in different situations and also focuses on the process and product.

== Topics ==
Situated learning was first projected by Jean Lave and Etienne Wenger as a model of learning in a community of practice. This type of learning allows an individual (students/learner) to learn by socialization, visualization, and imitation.

=== Situated cognition and problem-based learning ===
Learning begins with people trying to solve problems. When learning is problem-based, people explore real-life situations to find answers, or to solve the problems. Hung's study focuses on how important being social is to learning.

In believing that learning is social, Hung adds that learners who gravitate to communities with shared interests tend to benefit from the knowledge of those who are more knowledgeable than they are. He also says that these social experiences provide people with authentic experiences. When students are in these real-life situations they are compelled to learn. Hung concludes that taking a problem-based learning approach to designing a curriculum carries students to a higher level of thinking.

=== Rethinking education in the age of technology ===
In the 2009 article "Rethinking education in the age of technology", Collins & Halverson argued:

The pedagogy of the lifelong-learning era is evolving toward reliance on interaction. Sometimes this involves interacting with a rich technological environment such as a computer tutor or a game on the web and sometimes with other people by means of a computer network. The pedagogy of computer tutors echoes the apprenticeship model in setting individualized tasks for learners and offering guidance and feedback as they work.

Situated learning is becoming more involved with technology in ways to help individuals learn information differently than they have in the past. The model of learning a skill through technology mimics how individuals learned in the past from a professional in that skill. In the past when individuals learned about a particular topic it was done in person, in a hands-on environment. Technology makes it possible to do these same things using a computer or any other similar device. Interaction through the computer between individuals is one more way to make situated learning more successful as well as give students an opportunity to have another venue through which to learn. In fact,

... an understanding of video games as learning environments is becoming increasingly important as gaming culture rivals schooling for the attention of children and adolescents across the world. James Paul Gee argues that the compelling nature of video game participation is in part due to the underlying social, cognitive, and developmental learning principles around which successful games are built. With this perspective, games and gaming can be a source for inspiration in building more effective learning environments.

=== Training teachers to integrate technology into the classroom curriculum ===
Allowing students to have the opportunity to participate, interact and inject their own ideas is a way to obviously grow and make informed decisions. Gee has proven this with the use of video games. It enables the learner to build their social and communication skills as well as develop their cognition abilities. Computer-based learning software such as SimCity has permitted users to utilize situated learning by allowing them to run their own city and become dictators whereby they have to make informed decisions that will either deteriorate their people or help them thrive. As stated, more effective learning environments are built this way.

Instruction must be situated in an authentic context that resembles that of the classroom teacher to enrich their learning process by providing realistic experiences that more easily transfer.

Students process information by visualizing, hearing, reasoning and reflecting so they tend to learn more easily by having models to go by or imitate. In some study cases, teachers have gone as far as to make the classroom environment as homey as possible, whether it is a computerized setup or a physical setup. It gives the students the look and feel of being at home in a comfortable setting which allows them to feel and learn freely. It has been proven to have a great impact on the students learning abilities. This is another innovative way of utilizing situated learning.

When today's students enter their post-education professional lives, odds are pretty good that they will be asked to work with others from around the globe collaboratively to create content for diverse and wide-ranging audiences. Odds are also pretty good that they are going to need to read and write effectively in linked environments as they locate, analyze, remix, and share the best, most relevant content online for their own learning.

When students complete their education, they will be expected to use the skills they have learned throughout their educational career in their professional career. It is imperative that they are able to sufficiently utilize these skills to complete work goals. Through situated learning, students will be able to learn the skills and also be able to accurately use the skills they have learned. Situated learning allows students to gain experience through doing in some way and from this experience they are able to be productive in their lives after they have graduated.

=== After graduation ===
Situated learning continues after graduation. According to Halverson (2009):

Almost any job-related skill can be taught by practicing the skill, and computer simulations can create immersive environments where the target skills are necessary for solving engaging problems.

In situations where situated learning is not possible, simulations can offer an alternative way to provide employees with an authentic learning experience. Situated learning allows employees to immediately apply what they've learned in the context of performing job-related tasks. Learning occurs among peers who perform the same function. Problem-solving and the generation of new ideas can be better supported in a social learning environment where all of the stakeholders experience the positive effects of ongoing learning. Often, the benefits of situated learning extend well beyond the immediate group of practitioners throughout the organization and the broader community. Richardson notes that, in an educational setting, teachers can use collaborative technologies in their own practice in order to gain a better understanding of how to integrate these technologies in the classroom.

=== New tradition of online instruction ===
Many online learning courses still use the traditional teacher-directed, textbook-oriented curriculum that is compartmentalized by discipline. Many universities have begun to recognize that authentic situation learning must occur in online courses. A key aspect is to recognize that the unit itself must be an authentic activity and not just made up of disjointed activities.

The learning environment needs to provide well-defined activities which have real-world relevance, and which present a single complex task to be completed over a sustained period of time, rather than a series of shorter disconnected examples.

Utley presents Hung's argument that:

... learning embedded in rich situations assists adult learners to reflect on their actions, and discuss issues and problems with fellow members of a learning community.

While it may be possible for adult learners to gain knowledge and apply theories presented in other learning environments to what they experience in a real-world setting, situated learning offers an opportunity to work with others in considering how to best apply new concepts related to the specific context of their practice. While theoretical knowledge provides a foundation, the insights and skills developed through authentic practice can lead to more meaningful learning.

Learning centers are also making an impact on career education…Most of the participants are minorities, and a large proportion are African-American and Hispanic women. They range in age from 13 to 91, half of them between 20 and 31 years of age, but with a large number of teenagers as well. Most come to learn job skills and take classes at the centers, as well as to use the Internet facilities.

The increase in learning centers across the country is evidence of how the U.S., and the world really, has morphed into a society of continuing learners. Much of this learning is happening in centers described by Halverson and Collins. Examples of these learning centers, which are perfect examples of situated learning, include local libraries and job training centers. These learning centers are providing adults in particular with the kind of social interaction they need to extend their learning. This supports Hung's findings that people learn by simply being in certain situations with others. As organizations re-evaluate how they accomplish necessary workplace training with limited funds, they depend on informal learning that occurs within specific areas of practice to ensure that employees develop the skills they need to be effective.

=== The new world of work ===
Reliance on structured, theoretical training programs, especially offered by third-party providers, is decreasing, and companies are finding ways to facilitate authentic learning opportunities within their communities of practice. Wagner notes that financial considerations have led to fewer managers, so organizations are looking to those who actually do the work for ideas about improving their products and services.

The issue of choosing between very abstract and very specific instruction can be viewed in the following way. If abstract training is given, learners must also absorb the money and time costs of obtaining supplemental training for each distinct application. But if very specific training is given, they must completely retrain for each application...).

When determining whether abstract or specific instruction is going to be more productive it is important to look at which method will be most useful to the individuals that are learning the skill. If students receive specific instruction they are going to be capable of performing those set tasks only. When students are taught abstract instruction they are exposed to more skills that will be useful in helping them obtain a variety of jobs but at the same time, they may have training that is not necessarily needed. When money is "wasted" by educating individuals on things that are not needed for their future it is possible to look at the situation and realize that the monies could have been of more use in giving another individual more specific instruction.

In the world of academics and policy wonks, however, a growing number of alarmist studies have appeared over the last several years about how much more unprepared young Americans are for the demands of work today than was the case twenty years ago. Workers entering the labor force in the United States are less educated than young people in many other countries...

Our students are coming out of school unprepared and it seems that if they were in an educational setting where situated learning was implemented as much as possible, they would be better prepared for their futures. Based on Wagner's research we are less prepared than other countries as far as education goes, which is not necessarily something new, but it is definitely something that seems too far from changing. When our students are put into situations where they learn by doing they most likely will be more successful than if they were just told how something needed to be done.

=== Web tools for classrooms ===
In the 2010 article "Blogs, wikis, podcasts and other powerful web tools for classrooms", W. Richardson stipulated:

The act of writing in a Weblog, or 'blogging' can go a long way toward teaching skills such as research, organizations, and the synthesis of ideas.

Teachers/instructors have come to realize just how important it is to utilize the web as a teaching tool for the new generation of students (digital natives). One digital tool that can be used is a weblog. It gives the students an opportunity to think, research, and realize that they can write and have a voice that can be viewed and read by many who may or may not share the same idea. When students blog, they are creating journals/text entries which are considered to be English (writing) and reading; they also have the opportunity to utilize other learning tools such as videos, photos, and other digital media.

Networked learning, in contrast, is committed to a vision of the social that stresses cooperation, interactivity, mutual benefit, and social engagement. The power of ten working interactively will invariably outstrip the power of one looking to beat out the other nine.

Social networks like Facebook, Twitter and Ning allow learners, once they move beyond the personal connections, to embrace a community where they can learn from each other. Social interaction is an important part of the learning process. As technology has grown and become an integral part of the lives of children, teens, and young adults, older adults have been forced to adapt. For example, as more adults have been forced to move through the job market recently, they've turned to technology to develop new skills and to find work. Even fast-food restaurants require job seekers to complete employment applications online.

By the creation of visualizations, students learn to use different types of computer applications that will be useful as they select a direction for their future study.

Students learn in different manners and visualization or situated learning seems to be the most used of all learning styles. Students are able to mimic what they see and hear which enables them to retain information for the long term. Through visualizations of different types of computer applications; the student's knowledge is defined by the social process of interacting and doing. It allows the students to learn naturally as a result of social behavior. The computer application acts as a guide while the students learn naturally from their own experience. As always, situated learning accelerates a student's learning process and ability.

Web-based learning tools provide integrated environments of various technologies to support diverse educators' and learners' needs via the internet. The goals of these tools are to enhance face-to-face instruction and make distance learning are courses available. Each of these tools offers similar components, such as course note-posting, assignments submission, quizzes, and communication features. The primary motivation for developing these tools is to make it easier for instructors who have very little knowledge of HTML and web navigation to put course materials on the web. There are significant drawbacks as well of using these tools. For example, these systems course instructors and course administrators to use predetermined navigation models and course formats. These constraints may have a negative impact on their flexibility and usability for administrators, teachers, and students. A tool should be as such suitable for diverse courses campus-wide. Accordingly, a web-based learning tool should be able to provide facilities for courses, news, and announcements, and area to store course notes and related information synchronous and asynchronous tools such as e-mail, bulletin board, and chat facilities as well as features for creating and administering online quizzes and online submissions. Web tools also support inquiry-based learning suitable for teachers and students both involving the essence of inquiry-based learning.

Inquiry-based learning describes approaches to learning that are based on the investigation of questions, scenarios, or problems-often assisted by a facilitator. Inquiries will understand and study issues and questions to improve their knowledge or solutions. It includes problem-based learning and is used in small-scale investigation and projects as well as research. It will be much more beneficial for students because involvement in learning results in the improvement of possessing skills and attitudes that permit you to seek solutions and issues while you build your new knowledge. There are numerous web tools that support inquiry-based learning which teachers can use effectively to make all students interact in the class.

Web-based learning tools are also referred to as learning objects, interactive web-based tools that support learning by enhancing, amplifying, and guiding the cognitive processes of learners. It offers two noteworthy features that can reduce the impact of potential obstacles teachers face when using technology. Firstly it is designed to focus on specific concepts, making them easy to learn and use and more attractive to busy educators who have little time to learn more complex, advanced software packages. Ease of use also makes it more palatable to teachers who are apprehensive about using technology. Secondly, a wide range of web-based learning tools exists including drill and practice assessment tools or tutorials, video case studies or supports, general web-based multimedia resources, and self-contained interactive tools in a specific content area. In contrast with other learning technologies burdened with implementation challenges and costs, web-based learning tools are readily accessible over the net and teachers need not worry about extra cost or not having the latest version. It is speculated that the broad selection of readily accessible web-based learning tools will make it easier for teachers to integrate WBLT's into a classroom environment. Some of the best interactive web tools for educators.

=== Project-based learning ===
Project-based learning simulates the experiences that learners would have while performing the functions required in a job, which allows the opportunity to immediately apply what they've learned and benefit from an organization's existing knowledge base. With recent advances in technology, it is possible to facilitate the social aspects of learning by virtually connecting individuals within a distributed community of practice in the online environment.

Research shows that learners not only respond by feeding back information, but they also actively use what they know to explore, negotiate, interpret, and create. They construct solutions, thus shifting the emphasis toward the process of learning.

While these are skills that teachers are trying to develop in young learners, adults have already developed and used these skills. They have sharpened these skills through work, higher education, raising children or through marriage. As lifelong learners dealing with real-life problems, a project-based approach is what develops when they come together with other adults at brick-and-mortar learning centers or in social networking communities on the web.

== Evaluation ==
Situated learning activities are collaborative and complex therefore traditional methods of assessment are not sufficient. A few of the trends followed in evaluating the situated learning could be:

- Focus on the process rather than the products:

The process includes the content so this can be assessed by a few methods such as concept map and videotape coding.

- Non linear measures:

It means that the answers by the learner should be able to accept and defend multiple perspectives. They should measure the attitude, efficacy, perceptual skills and higher-order thinking.

- Using technology:

Collaboration with technology will allow to track the students activities like time spent on planning, collecting information with respect to solve a problem etc.

== See also ==
- Cognitive apprenticeship
- Constructivism (philosophy of education)
- Cultural-historical activity theory (CHAT)
- Educational technology
- Experiential learning
- Instructional design
- Situated cognition
- Transformative learning
