= Software Engineering 2004 =

Software engineering curriculum

The Software Engineering 2004 (SE2004) —formerly known as Computing Curriculum Software Engineering (CCSE)— is a document that provides recommendations for undergraduate education in software engineering. SE2004 was initially developed by a steering committee between 2001 and 2004. Its development was sponsored by the Association for Computing Machinery and the IEEE Computer Society. Important components of SE2004 include the Software Engineering Education Knowledge, a list of topics that all graduates should know, as well as a set of guidelines for implementing curricula and a set of proposed courses.
