= Legitimate peripheral participation =

Legitimate peripheral participation (LPP) describes how newcomers become experienced members and eventually old timers of a community of practice or collaborative project. LPP identifies learning as a contextual social phenomenon, achieved through participation in a community practice. According to LPP, newcomers become members of a community initially by participating in simple and low-risk tasks that are nonetheless productive and necessary and further the goals of the community. Through peripheral activities, novices become acquainted with the tasks, vocabulary, and organizing principles of the community's practitioners.

Gradually, as newcomers become old timers and gain a recognized level of mastery, their participation takes forms that are more and more central to the functioning of the community. LPP suggests that membership in a community of practice is mediated by the possible forms of participation to which newcomers have access, both physically and socially. In the case of a mentor-mentee relationship between older timers and newcomers, the old timer has both the power to confer legitimacy to the newcomer, and to control the newcomer's level of access to different community practices and experiences. If newcomers can directly observe the practices of experts, they understand the broader context into which their own efforts fit. Conversely LPP suggests that newcomers who are separated from the experts have limited access to their tools and community and therefore have limited growth. As participation increases, situations arise that allow the participant to assess how well they are contributing through their efforts, thus legitimate peripheral participation provides a means for self-evaluation.

LPP is not reserved for descriptions of membership in formal organizations or professions whose practices are highly defined. For example, O'Donovan and Kirk suggest that young people's participation in sport can be compared to a Community of Practice related to physical education.

In his later work on communities of practice, Wenger abandoned the concept of legitimate peripheral participation and introduced the idea of a duality instead; however, the term is still widely used in relation to situated learning.

== See also ==
- Community of practice
- Cultural-historical activity theory (CHAT)
- Knowledge sharing
- Online participation
