= Étienne Wenger =

Swiss information scientist

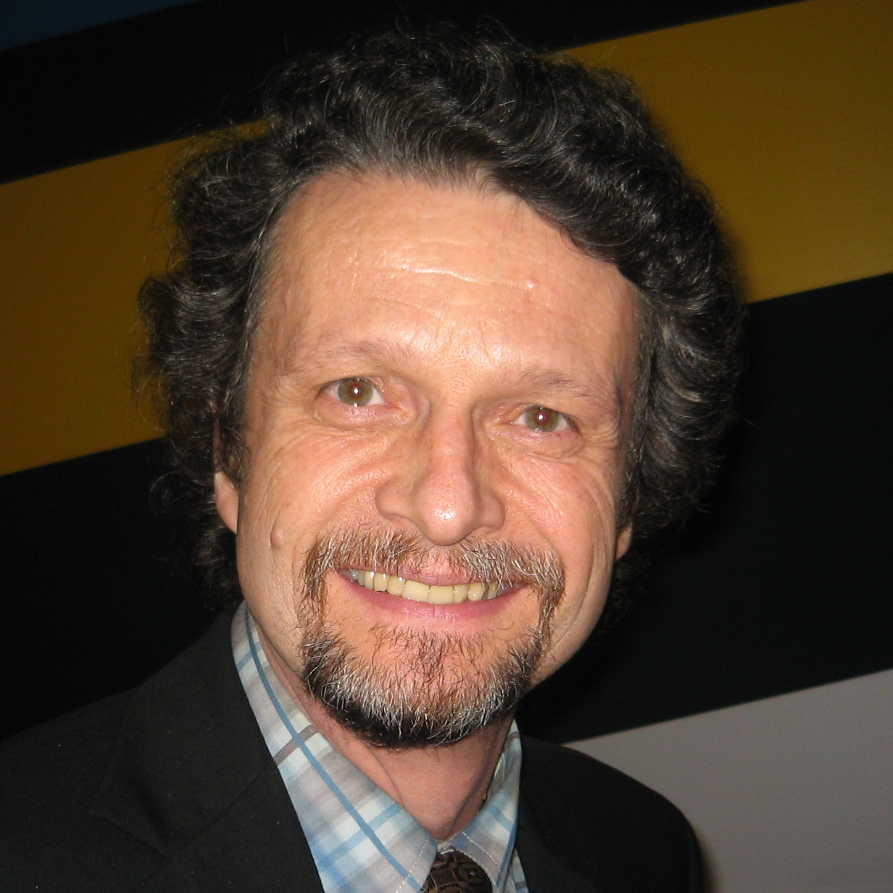
- Etienne Wenger
- Born: 1952 (age 73–74); Neuchâtel, Switzerland
- Education: University of California, Irvine
- Scientific career
- Thesis: Toward a theory of cultural transparency: elements of a social discourse of the visible and the invisible (1990)
- Website: https://wenger-trayner.com/etienne/

Étienne Charles Wenger (born 1952) is an educational theorist and practitioner, best known for his formulation (with Jean Lave) of the theory of situated cognition and his more recent work in the field of communities of practice.

== Life ==
Having grown up in the French-speaking parts of Switzerland, Wegner received a B.S. in Computer Science from the University of Geneva. He then graduated from the University of California, Irvine earning an M.S. and a Ph.D. in Information and Computer Science in 1990.

== Work ==
Wenger initially came upon the concept of communities of practice when he was approached by John Seely Brown, to join the Institute for Research of Learning. There Wenger worked with anthropologist Jean Lave, observing apprenticeships among traditional tailors in Africa. Through the study of these cases Lave and Wenger concluded that most learning does not take place with the master, it takes place among the apprentices.

According to Wenger, "Communities of practice are groups of people who share a concern or a passion for something they do and learn how to do it better as they interact regularly."

Currently, Wenger is working on "Learning for a Small Planet." This research is focused on how students learn in the 21st century, and how the integration of technology is affecting education. It is also emphasizing the various domains of learning: "education, business, and civic" and how it is not each one separately, but rather the synthesis of them that enables effective learning. It also goes on to discuss the identity of a learner, and is studying how one must be a participant in multiple groups to be able to form a full identity and learn successfully.

== Selected publications ==
- Wenger, Etienne (1987). Artificial Intelligence and Tutoring Systems: Computational and Cognitive Approaches to the Communication of Knowledge. Morgan Kaufmann Press. ISBN 978-0-934-61326-2.
- Lave, Jean; Wenger, Etienne (1991). Situated Learning: Legitimate Peripheral Participation. Cambridge: Cambridge University Press. ISBN 0-521-42374-0.
- Wenger, Etienne (1998). Communities of Practice: Learning, Meaning, and Identity. Cambridge: Cambridge University Press. ISBN 978-0-521-66363-2.
- Wenger, Etienne; McDermott, Richard; Snyder, William M. (2002). Cultivating Communities of Practice (Hardcover). Harvard Business Press; 1 edition. ISBN 978-1-57851-330-7.
- Wenger, Etienne (2009). Digital Habitats. Portland: CPsquare. ISBN 978-0-521-66363-2.

== See also ==
- Situated learning
- Legitimate peripheral participation
- Community of practice
- Knowledge Management
- Landscape of practice
