= Community of practice =

Community

A community of practice (CoP), also called a vertical community, is a group of people who "share a concern or a passion for something they do and learn how to do it better as they interact regularly". The concept was first proposed by cognitive anthropologist Jean Lave and educational theorist Etienne Wenger in their 1991 book Situated Learning. Wenger significantly expanded on this concept in his 1998 book Communities of Practice. A CoP can form around members' shared interests or goals. Through being part of a CoP, the members learn from each other and develop their identities.

CoP members can engage with one another in physical settings (for example, in a lunchroom at work, an office, a factory floor), but CoP members are not necessarily co-located. They can form a virtual community of practice (VCoP) where the CoP is primarily located in an online community such as a discussion board, newsgroup, or on a social networking service.

Communities of practice have existed for as long as people have been learning and sharing their experiences through storytelling. The idea is rooted in American pragmatism, especially C. S. Peirce's concept of the "community of inquiry", as well as John Dewey's principle of learning through occupation.

== Overview ==
For Etienne Wenger, learning in a CoP is central to identity because learning is conceptualized as social participation – the individual actively participates in the practices of social communities, thus developing their role and identity within the community. In this context, a community of practice is a group of individuals with shared interests or goals who develop both their individual and shared identities through community participation.

The structural characteristics of a community of practice are redefined to a domain of knowledge, a notion of community and a practice:

- Domain: A domain of knowledge creates common ground, inspires participation, guides learning, and gives meaning to the actions of the individuals and community.
- Community: The notion of a community creates the social fabric for learning. A strong community fosters interactions and encourages people to collaborate and share ideas.
- Practice: While the domain provides a shared community interest or goal, the practice is the specific focus around which the community develops, shares and maintains its core of knowledge.

In many organizations, communities of practice are integral to the organization structure.

An important aspect and function of communities of practice is increasing organization performance. Lesser and Storck identify four areas of organizational performance that can be affected by communities of practice:

- Decreasing the learning curve for new employees
- Responding more rapidly to customer needs and inquiries
- Reducing rework and preventing "reinvention of the wheel"
- Generating new ideas for products and services

== Types ==
=== Compared to functional or project teams ===
Collaboration constellations differ in various ways. Some are under organizational control (e.g., teams), whereas others, like CoPs, are self-organized or under the control of individuals. Researchers have studied how collaboration types vary in their temporal or boundary focus, and the basis of their members' relationships.

== Benefits ==
=== Social capital ===
Social capital is a multi-dimensional concept with public and private facets.

=== Knowledge management ===
Wasko and Faraj describe three kinds of knowledge: knowledge as object, knowledge embedded within individuals, and knowledge embedded in a community. CoPs are associated with finding, sharing, transferring, and archiving knowledge, as well as making explicit "expertise", or articulating tacit knowledge. Tacit knowledge is considered to be valuable context-based experiences that cannot easily be captured, codified and stored.

Because knowledge management is seen "primarily as a problem of capturing, organizing, and retrieving information, evoking notions of databases, documents, query languages, and data mining", the community of practice is viewed as a potential rich source for helpful information in the form of actual experiences; in other words, best practices. Thus, for knowledge management, if community practices within a CoP can be codified and archived, they provide rich content and contexts that can be accessed for future use.

== Factors ==
=== Individuals ===
Members of CoPs are thought to be more efficient and effective conduits of information and experiences. While organizations tend to provide manuals to meet employee training needs, CoPs help foster the process of storytelling among colleagues, which helps them strengthen their skills.

Studies have shown that workers spend a third of their time looking for information and are five times more likely to turn to a co-worker than an explicit source of information (book, manual, or database). Conferring with CoP members saves time because community members have tacit knowledge, which can be difficult to store and retrieve for people unfamiliar with the CoP. For example, someone might share one of their best ways of responding to a situation based on their experiences, which may enable another person to avoid mistakes, thus shortening the learning curve. In a CoP, members can openly discuss and brainstorm about a project, which can lead to new capabilities. The type of information that is shared and learned in a CoP is boundless. Paul Duguid distinguishes tacit knowledge (knowing how) from explicit knowledge (knowing what). Performing optimally in a job requires the application of theory into practice. CoPs help individuals bridge the gap between knowing what and knowing how.

As members of CoPs, individuals report increased communication with people (professionals, interested parties, hobbyists), less dependence on geographic proximity, and the generation of new knowledge. This assumes that interactions occur naturally when individuals come together. Social and interpersonal factors play a role in the interaction, and research shows that some individuals share or withhold knowledge and expertise from others because their knowledge relates to their professional identities, position, and interpersonal relationships.

==== Social presence ====
Communicating with others in a CoP involves creating social presence. Chih-Hsiung defines social presence as "the degree of salience of another person in an interaction and the consequent salience of an interpersonal relationship". Social presence may affect the likelihood for an individual to participate in a CoP (especially in online environments and virtual communities of practice). CoP management often encounter barriers that inhibit knowledge exchange between members. Reasons for these barriers may include egos and personal attacks, large overwhelming CoPs, and time constraints.

==== Motivation ====
Motivation to share knowledge is critical to success in communities of practice. Studies show that members are motivated to become active participants in a CoP when they view knowledge as a public good, a moral obligation and/or a community interest.

==== Collaboration ====
Collaboration is essential to ensure that communities of practice thrive. In a study on knowledge exchange in a business network, Sveiby and Simons found that more seasoned colleagues tend to foster a more collaborative culture.

== Successful cultivation ==
What makes a community of practice succeed depends on the purpose and objective of the community as well as the interests and resources of community members. Wenger identified seven actions to cultivate communities of practice:

1. Design the community to evolve naturally – Because the nature of a community of practice is dynamic, in that the interests, goals, and members are subject to change, CoP forums should be designed to support shifts in focus.
2. Create opportunities for open dialog within and with outside perspectives – While the members and their knowledge are the CoP's most valuable resource, it is also beneficial to look outside of the CoP to understand different possibilities for achieving their learning goals.
3. Welcome and allow different levels of participation – Wenger identifies 3 main levels of participation. 1) The core group that participates intensely in the community through discussions and projects. This group typically takes on leadership roles in guiding the group. 2) The active group that attends and participates regularly, but not to the level of the core group. 3) The peripheral group who, while passive participants in the community, still learn from their level of involvement. Wenger notes that the third group typically represents the majority of the community.
4. Develop both public and private community spaces – While CoPs typically operate in public spaces where all members share, discuss and explore ideas, they should also offer private exchanges. Different CoP members could coordinate relationships among members and resources in an individualized approach based on specific needs.
5. Focus on the value of the community – CoPs should create opportunities for participants to explicitly discuss the value and productivity of their participation in the group.
6. Combine familiarity and excitement – CoPs should offer the expected learning opportunities as part of their structure, and opportunities for members to shape their learning experience together by brainstorming and examining the conventional and radical wisdom related to their topic.
7. Find and nurture a regular rhythm for the community – CoPs should coordinate a thriving cycle of activities and events that allow members to regularly meet, reflect, and evolve. The rhythm, or pace, should maintain an anticipated level of engagement to sustain the vibrancy of the community, yet not so fast-paced that it becomes unwieldy and overwhelming.

== History ==
Since the publication of "Situated Learning: Legitimate Peripheral Participation", communities of practice have been the focus of attention, first as a theory of learning and later as part of the field of knowledge management. Andrew Cox offers a more critical view of the different ways in which the term communities of practice can be interpreted.

=== Early years ===
The process by which a community member becomes part of a community occurs through legitimate peripheral participation. Legitimation and participation define ways of belonging to a community, whereas peripherality and participation are concerned with location and identity in the social world.

Lave and Wenger's research examined how a community and its members learn within apprenticeships. When newcomers join an established community, they initially observe and perform simple tasks in basic roles while they learn community norms and practices. For example, an apprentice electrician might watch and learn through observation before doing any electrical work, but would eventually take on more complicated electrical tasks. Lave and Wenger described this socialization process as legitimate peripheral participation. Lave and Wenger referred to a "community of practice" as a group that shares a common interest and desire to learn from and contribute to the community.

=== Later years ===
In his later work, Wenger shifted his focus from legitimate peripheral participation toward tensions that emerge from dualities. He identifies four dualities that exist in communities of practice: participation-reification, designed-emergent, identification-negotiability and local-global. The participation-reification duality has been a particular focus in the field of knowledge management.

Wenger describes three dimensions of practice that support community cohesion: mutual engagement, negotiation of a joint enterprise and shared repertoire.

- Mutual Engagement: Through participation in the community, members establish norms and build relationships. In doing so, they develop a shared understanding for how to interpret ideas or events. For example, community members might share similar technical jargon or inside jokes, but new members need to learn about their meaning through mutual engagement. These relationships bind the community members as a social entity.
- Joint Enterprise: Community members share similar goals, but they may have different motivations. Joint enterprise refers to the negotiation of those goals as a community, hence "joint". When community members negotiate a joint enterprise, they also develop mutual accountability for their actions within the community. These actions include how to directly attain their goals, as well as more implicit norms such as what topics can or cannot be discussed; what tools can or cannot be used; or what actions can or cannot be taken in different circumstances.
- Shared Repertoire: The community produces communal resources known as shared repertoire. This is used in the pursuit of their joint enterprise and can include both literal and symbolic meanings. For example, shared repertoire can include physical tools like a communal document or manual, or intangible tools like community routines and concepts.

== Society and culture ==
=== Examples ===
The communities Lave and Wenger studied were naturally forming as practitioners of craft and skill-based activities met to share experiences and insights.

Lave and Wenger observed situated learning within a community of practice among Yucatán midwives, Liberian tailors, navy quartermasters and meat cutters, and insurance claims processors. Other fields have used the concept of CoPs in education, sociolinguistics, material anthropology, medical education, second language acquisition, Parliamentary Budget Offices, health care and business sectors, research data, and child mental health practice (AMBIT).

A famous example of a community of practice within an organization is the Xerox customer service representatives who repaired machines. The Xerox reps began exchanging repair tips and tricks in informal meetings over breakfast or lunch. Eventually, Xerox saw the value of these interactions and created the Eureka project, which allowed these interactions to be shared across its global network of representatives. The Eureka database is estimated to have saved the corporation $100 million.

Examples of large virtual CoPs include:

- Wikipedia
- Healthcare Information For All (HIFA)
- Sustainable Sanitation Alliance (SuSanA)

== See also ==
- Adaptive management
- Discourse community
- Distributed leadership
- Duality (CoPs)
- Guild
- Knowledge transfer
- Knowledge tagging
- Landscape of practice
- Learning community
- Learning organization
- Network of practice
- Organizational learning
- Personal network
- Professional learning community
- Social environment
- Situated cognition
- Situated learning
- Teamwork
- Thought collective
- Value network
- Value network analysis
- Virtual community of practice
