= Jean Lave =

American anthropologist

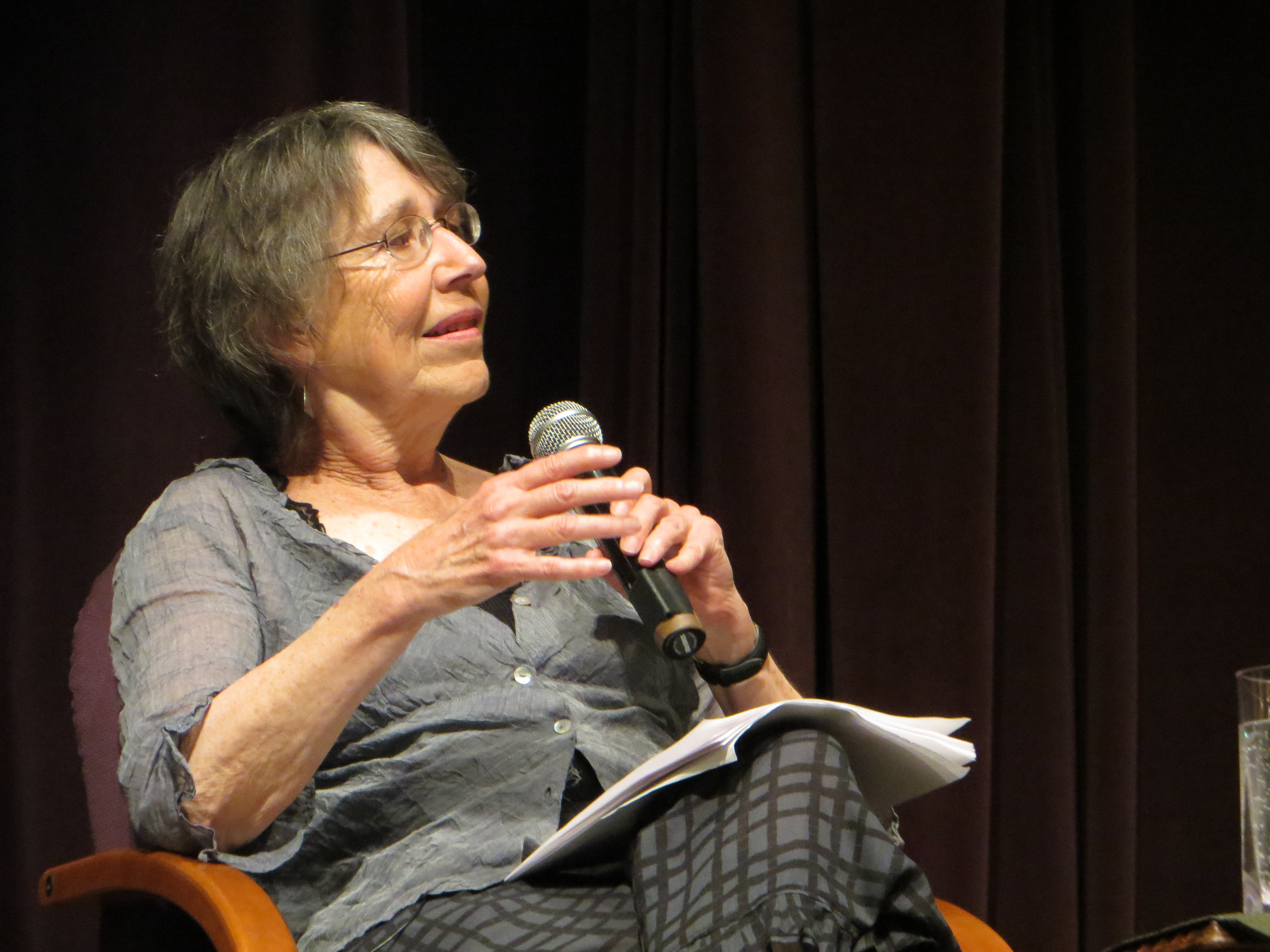
- Born: 1939 (age 86–87)
- Known for: Communities of practice Legitimate peripheral participation Situated learning

Academic background
- Education: Stanford University (B.A.); Harvard University (PhD, 1968)

Academic work
- Discipline: Social anthropology
- Institutions: University of California, Irvine; University of California, Berkeley

Jean Lave is a social anthropologist who theorizes learning as changing participation in on-going changing practice. Her lifework challenges conventional theories of learning and education.

== Education and career ==
Lave received a Bachelor's from Stanford University, and completed her doctorate in social anthropology at Harvard University in 1968. She taught at the University of California, Irvine and is currently a professor emerita of geography at the University of California, Berkeley.

In 1988, Lave published her first book, Cognition in Practice: Mind, Mathematics and Culture in Everyday Life. In it, she explores how arithmetic is used outside of school contexts, with implications for sociological understanding of the relationship between cognition, practice, culture, and society. For instance, she shows that grocery shoppers in Orange County, California who could successfully do the mathematics needed for comparison shopping were less able to do the same mathematics when they were presented with the same problems in a formal test. The work is considered a critique of learning transfer theory and challenges the drawing of sharp boundaries between theories of rationality and theories of everyday thought.

In 1991, Lave pioneered the theories of situated learning and communities of practice with the publication of her seminal text, Situated Learning: Legitimate Peripheral Participation (in collaboration with her student Étienne Wenger). The theory of situated learning posits that, in the words of anthropologist Nigel Rapport, learning is a "social process" and that individuals "learn best, it is suggested, in a situation in which participants share a common identity and goals... in the middle of our lives, while doing other everyday things, alongside people with whom we identify." Furthermore, Lave's studies of apprenticeship in this and subsequent works are recognized as a significant critique of educational psychology. As of September 2024, Situated Learning has been cited over 103,000 times.

== Honors and awards ==
In 1989, Lave was named a Spencer Senior Scholar of the Spencer Foundation. In 1994, Lave received the Sylvia Scribner Research Award from the American Educational Research Association. In 2013, Lave was jointly awarded the Lifetime Achievement Award from the American Society for Psychological Anthropology with Anthony F. C. Wallace.

She holds honorary degrees from both Aarhus University, awarded in 2008, and the University of St Andrews, awarded in 2015.

== Selected publications ==
Lave's published books include:

- Learning and Everyday Life: Access, Participation, and Changing Practice (2019)
- Apprenticeship in Critical Ethnographic Practice (2011)
- History in Person: Enduring Struggles, Contentious Practice, Intimate Identities (edited with Dorothy Holland, 2000)
- Understanding Practice (co-authored with Seth Chaiklin, 1993)
- Situated Learning: Legitimate Peripheral Participation (co-authored with Etienne Wenger, 1991)
- Cognition in Practice (1988)

== See also ==
- Communities of Practice
- Legitimate peripheral participation
- Situated learning
- Sex and intelligence
- Situated cognition
