= REE Automotive =

Electric vehicle manufacturer

REE Automotive, Ltd.
- RƎE

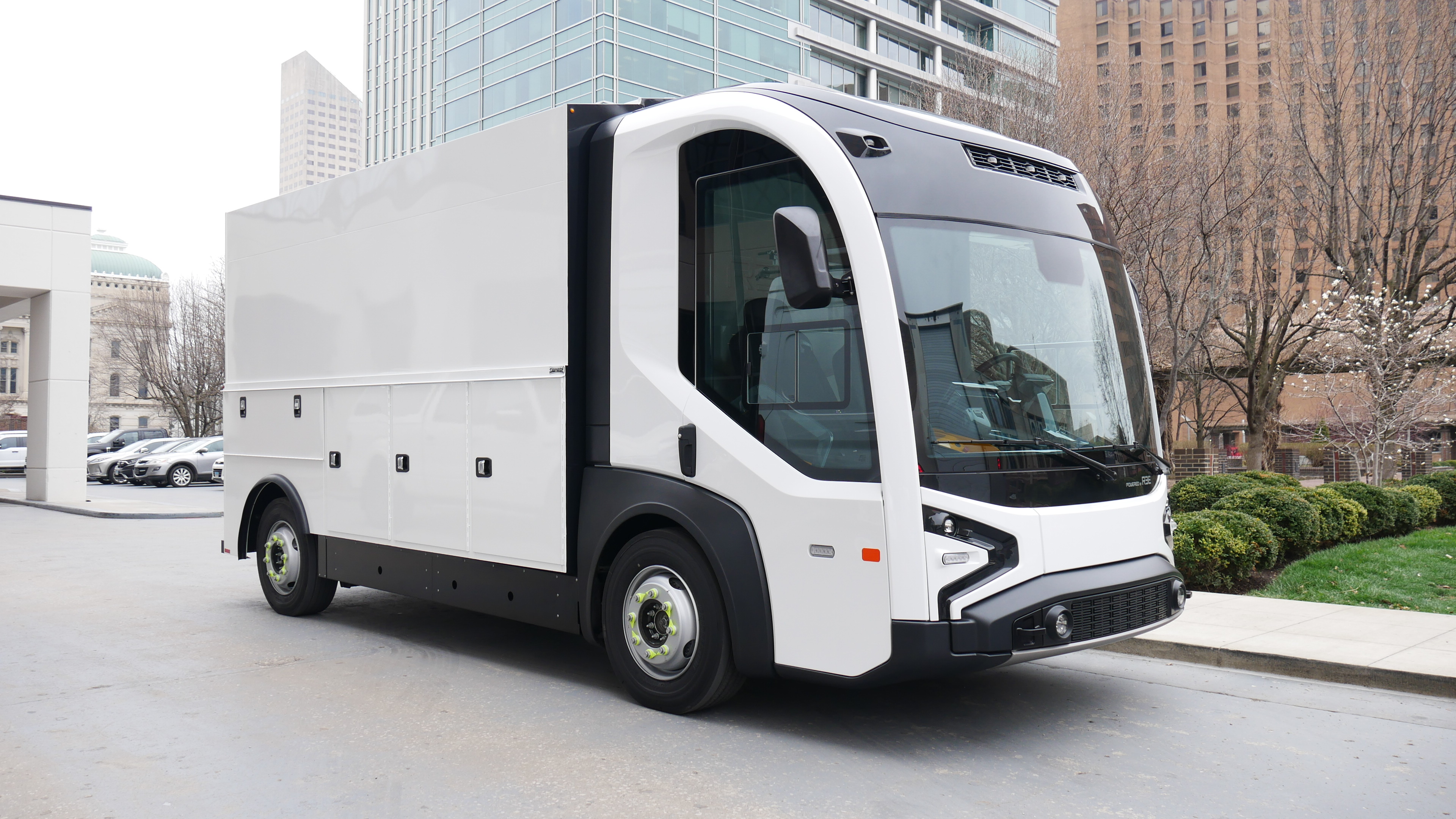
- P7-C class 4 electric truck by REE Automotive built upon the modular P7 platform
- Native name: רי אוטומוטיב
- Formerly: SoftWheel (2011–2019)
- Type: Public
- Traded as: Nasdaq: REE
- Industry: Automotive
- Founded: January 16, 2011; 15 years ago in Israel
- Headquarters: Glil Yam, Israel
- Area served: North America
- Key people: Daniel Barel (CEO); Ahishay Sardes (CTO)
- Products: P7 corner module; P7 platform chassis; P7-C cab chassis
- Production output: 25 test vehicles (2023)
- Number of employees: 244 (March 2024)
- Website: ree.auto
- Footnotes; FORM 20-F for the fiscal year 2023

REE Automotive, Ltd. was an automotive manufacturer. The company attempted to manufacture electric vehicles before pivoting in 2025 to software development exclusively. It petitioned for insolvency in 2026. Before shuttering vehicle development and sales, the company operated an engineering and manufacturing center in the United Kingdom, and based its final vehicle assembly, sales, and customer service operations in the United States. REE software development was based in Israel.

REE Automotive planned in 2024 to sell truck fleets to rental companies such as Penske and U-Haul, provide its corner modules to truck manufacturers such as Hino, and sell trucks to various fleet operators through its distributor network. The company expected in early 2025 to start deliveries of scale-production vehicles in the first half of 2025, deliver several hundreds of vehicles in the second half of 2025, and ramp up production to the thousands of vehicles in 2026. The company announced in May 2025 that it has paused its production plans and will focus instead on their software offerings to OEMs and technology companies. Production was halted after REE couldn't secure major automaker partners or large institutional buyers. REE petitioned the court for insolvency in July 2026.

== Founding ==
=== SoftWheel ===
Before changing its name to REE Automotive, the company was called SoftWheel. SoftWheel was founded in 2011 by Gilad Woolf. Woolf engaged the services of Amihai Gros and the services of Ahishai Sardes of Ziv Av Engineering, who developed a wheelchair wheel with an embedded suspension system. Daniel Barel joined as CEO in 2013 after learning of the company through Gros. In 2014 SoftWheel raised three million dollars in an effort to enter the electric bicycle market with its in-wheel selective suspension system, which is stiff while riding on level surfaces, and becomes shock-absorbent upon impacts. The wheels retailed at $1800 a pair.

=== Shift to the automotive industry ===
Faced with its investors potentially pulling funding and shutting down the company, SoftWheel began developing in-wheel shock absorbers for bicycles, motorcycles, and automobiles. By mid-2017, the company planned to manufacture products for bicycles and develop a product for automobiles, raising a total of 15 million USD, with plans for two more assembly lines in addition to its existing ones for wheelchair wheels in Israel and the United States. The company raised an additional $25 million in 2018 in an effort to pivot its business to the automotive market, for a total of $40 million, partly from investors in the automotive industry such as Mitsubishi and Musashi Seimitsu.

Daniel Barel announced the company's new name, REE, at the EcoMotion convention in June 2019, where he unveiled an automotive platform for autonomous delivery vehicles. The name-change signifies "reinventing" the car by discarding the mechanical connections between the wheels in favor of electronic by-wire control.

=== Initial stock market financing ===
The company expected to raise 436 million USD through a special-purpose acquisition company merger with 10X Capital Venture Acquisition Corp, of which $200 million were expected from 10X Capital investors. Three-quarters of the 10X Capital shares were redeemed by investors upon the merger, reducing the raised capital by about $153 million. A total of $285 million were raised by the company when going public on NASDAQ on July 23, 2021, resulting in about $318 million in cash on-hand, and a valuation of about three billion dollars. The CEO said that while vertical automotive companies require 20 billion dollars or more to develop their supply chain and manufacturing capabilities, the company is set to achieve serial manufacturing and commercialization of its first product line through its horizontal business alliances using its $300 million in cash.

Following the merger, REE Automotive's valuation dropped significantly, reaching a low of about $40 million in September 2024. The company had no substantial revenue by February 2023, when it laid-off 31 employees which were approximately 11% of its workforce. The company expected in May 2023 that its cash runway will finance its operations past its test fleet deliveries and into the scaling-up of its business.

=== Planned production at scale ===
After beginning test-vehicle production in 2023, the company raised $24 million and planned to raise a further $10 million in working capital for production in 2024 and for tooling for its full-scale production in the United States in 2025, alongside a 25% reduction in its cash burn rate in 2023 and a further planned 25% reduction in 2024. The company revised its production plans in 2024, choosing to utilize the contract manufacturing services of Roush Industries and the supply-chain services of Samvardhana Motherson, reducing its cash burn rate while pushing the start of production to the fourth quarter of 2024 and the start of customer deliveries of scale-produced vehicles to the first half of 2025. The company entered an agreement in September 2024 with Motherson, which became its exclusive supply chain expansion and management partner, and shared commercial operations partner. Motherson invested $45 million in REE Automotive which the company intends to use as working capital for full-scale production in 2025.

The company expected as of January 2025 to start deliveries of scale-production vehicles in the first half of 2025, break-even for BOM on the sale of several hundreds of vehicles in the second half of 2025, and positive EBITDA on the sale of several thousands of vehicles in 2026.

==== Business model ====
REE Automotive was structured for a capex-light business model with horizontal alliances with tier-one manufacturers. Among its partners are American Axle, Mahindra & Mahindra, Musashi Seimitsu, and KYB. The company said that unlike Tesla or Rivian who spend billions of dollars building manufacturing capacity, REE Automotive will use its partners' existing excess manufacturing capacity which allows it to quickly scale up production. The company assembled parts provided by its partners onto its corner modules and platforms at the company's manufacturing facilities. The company aimed to provide, along with its partners, "a full turn-key solution" for electric vehicle fleets, which includes the sale of full vehicles, and services such as vehicle financing and charging infrastructure. These services were meant to allow companies' fleets to transition from internal combustion engine vehicles to electric vehicles.

Small commercial electric vehicle startups like REE Automotive attempted to fill the void in commercial EV offerings left by traditional automotive manufacturers in the late 2010s. The startup companies expected to beat the traditional manufacturers to market, or partner with them, or be acquired by them. Traditional manufacturers like Ford and GM have since started to fill the commercial EV void, bringing the small manufacturers into direct competition with them and leading to difficulties in raising funding and generating sales to large customers. This put small manufacturers like Arrival, Canoo, Lordstown, and ELMS in financial difficulties. REE Automotive hoped to overcome these issues with its P7 offerings and its horizontal business model.

As of 2024 REE Automotive planned to sell truck fleets to rental companies such as Penske and U-Haul, provide its corner modules to truck manufacturers such as Hino, and sell trucks to various fleet operators through its distributor network. REE estimated the total addressable market of its P7 platform was over 200,000 class 3 to class 5 trucks a year in the US, according to research by BloombergNEF.

=== Pivot to software ===
REE halted production in 2025 after it couldn't secure major automaker partners or large institutional buyers. The company announced in May 2025 that it will pause its production plans and focus instead on their software offerings to OEMs and technology companies.

== Technology ==
=== Corner modules ===
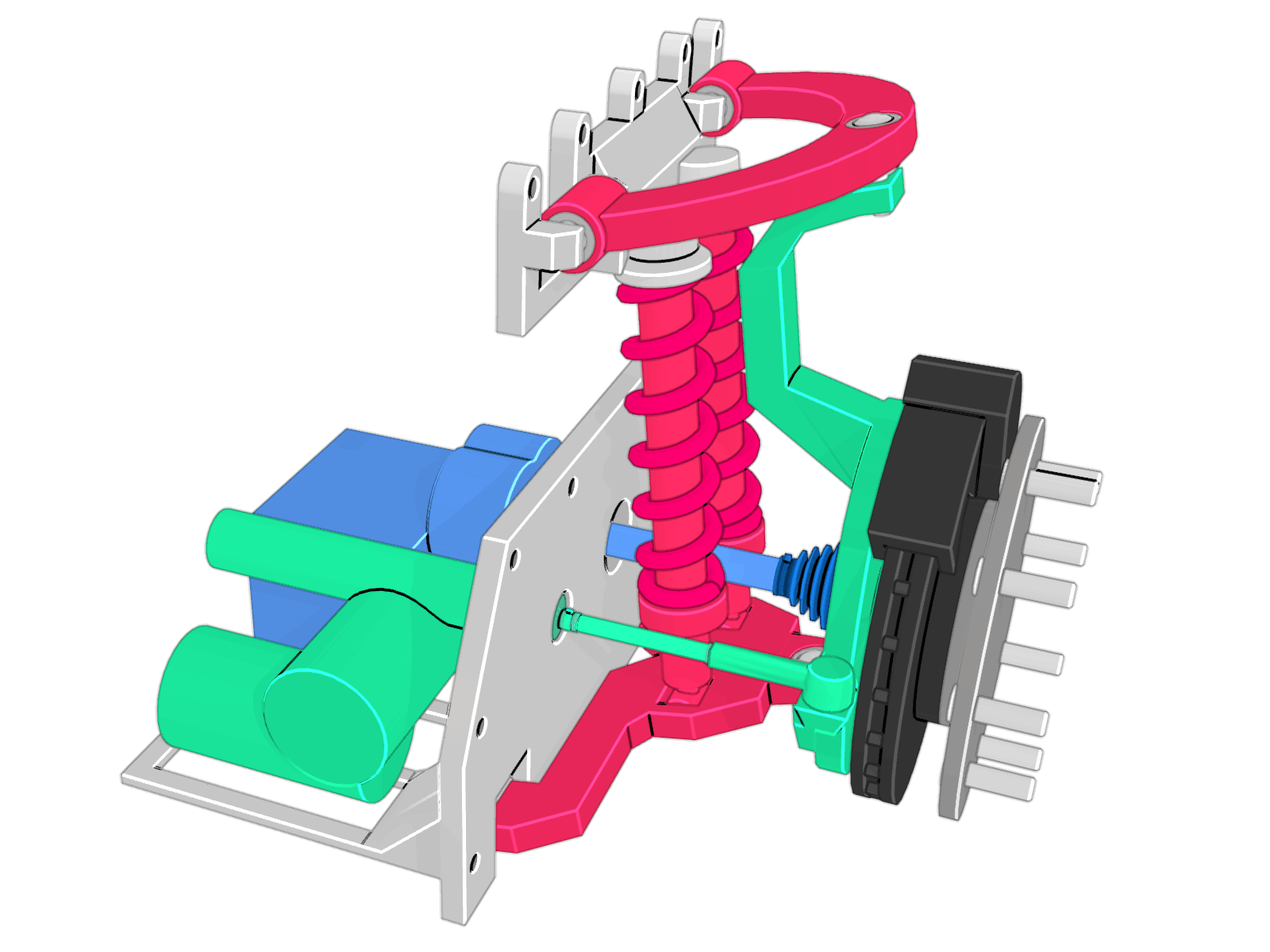
Simplified diagram of a corner module. Blue: motor and drive shaft. Green: steering mechanism. Red: wishbone suspension with twin dampers. Black: brake and park brake.

The core technology developed by REE Automotive is the corner module. These modules are located directly adjacent to each wheel, housing all of the vehicle's drive systems. The modules are controlled by-wire, eliminating the use of mechanical connections that are traditionally housed throughout the chassis, like a steering column, drive-train, and so on. This design allows for a flat platform chassis with more space for passengers or cargo, and easy replacement of each module.

Prior to its initial fundraising on the stock market, the company developed five classes of corner modules for different vehicle classes up to 7 tonnes gross vehicle weight. Following its fundraising shortfall, the company focused on developing and bringing a single product line to market, based on the P7 corner module for up to 8.9 tonnes gross vehicle weight.

Each P7 corner module houses the following: a wheel-end drive unit co-developed with American Axle consisting of an electric motor with regenerative braking, a transmission, and an inverter; steering actuators developed by Trio; double wishbone suspension with twin dampers; brakes and braking actuators co-developed with Brembo; sensors; and an electronic control unit (ECU) based on Infineon AURIX running REE Automotive software that manages all the systems. A P7 platform includes four corner modules that are controlled in tandem by a central ECU.

Company representatives presented a production-intent P7 corner module in March 2023 at Work Truck Week, saying the module is fastened to the platform on a single plane entirely from the side of the vehicle, with no special tools. The P7 platform's four corner modules are interchangeable, simplifying manufacturing and maintenance. A module may be removed and a new module fastened to the platform in 20 minutes, with a further 40 minutes of calibration for the vehicle to become operational again.

==== Safety and security ====
Redundancy is implemented at the vehicle level and at the component level for fail-operational safety and fault detection. At the vehicle level, the central ECU can compensate for the failure of a corner module or one of its components by using the other three modules for corrective steering, braking, and propulsion. At the component level, many have built-in redundancy: the central ECU and each corner module ECU features two Infineon AURIX micro-controllers operating in a lockstep configuration, allowing for fault-detection; the ECUs are powered by redundant low-voltage batteries connected to redundant low-voltage power grids; there are redundant micro-controller communication networks; there are redundant medium voltage sources that power redundant steering actuators for each wheel; there are redundant sensors; and so on. These safety features are specified by the ISO 26262 standard level D. Vehicle cybersecurity is specified by the ISO/SAE 21434 standard and UNCE regulations 155, 156, and 157, and implemented using dedicated cryptographic modules that encrypt all communication between the ECUs and the drive system components.

=== Prototypes and concept cars ===
==== Autonomous vehicles ====
REE Automotive presented its first public prototype at the EcoMotion convention in June 2019. Early prototypes shown in 2019 were dubbed the Air, Share, and Bolder. The prototypes offered two or four wheel-end motors with varying power ratings, attached to flat chassis platforms of varying sizes. Later, similar prototypes were dubbed the P1, P2, and P4. They were designed for 1.3, 2.5, and 4.5 tonne gross vehicle weight, respectively. All the prototypes were autonomous-ready, driven entirely electronically, by-wire.

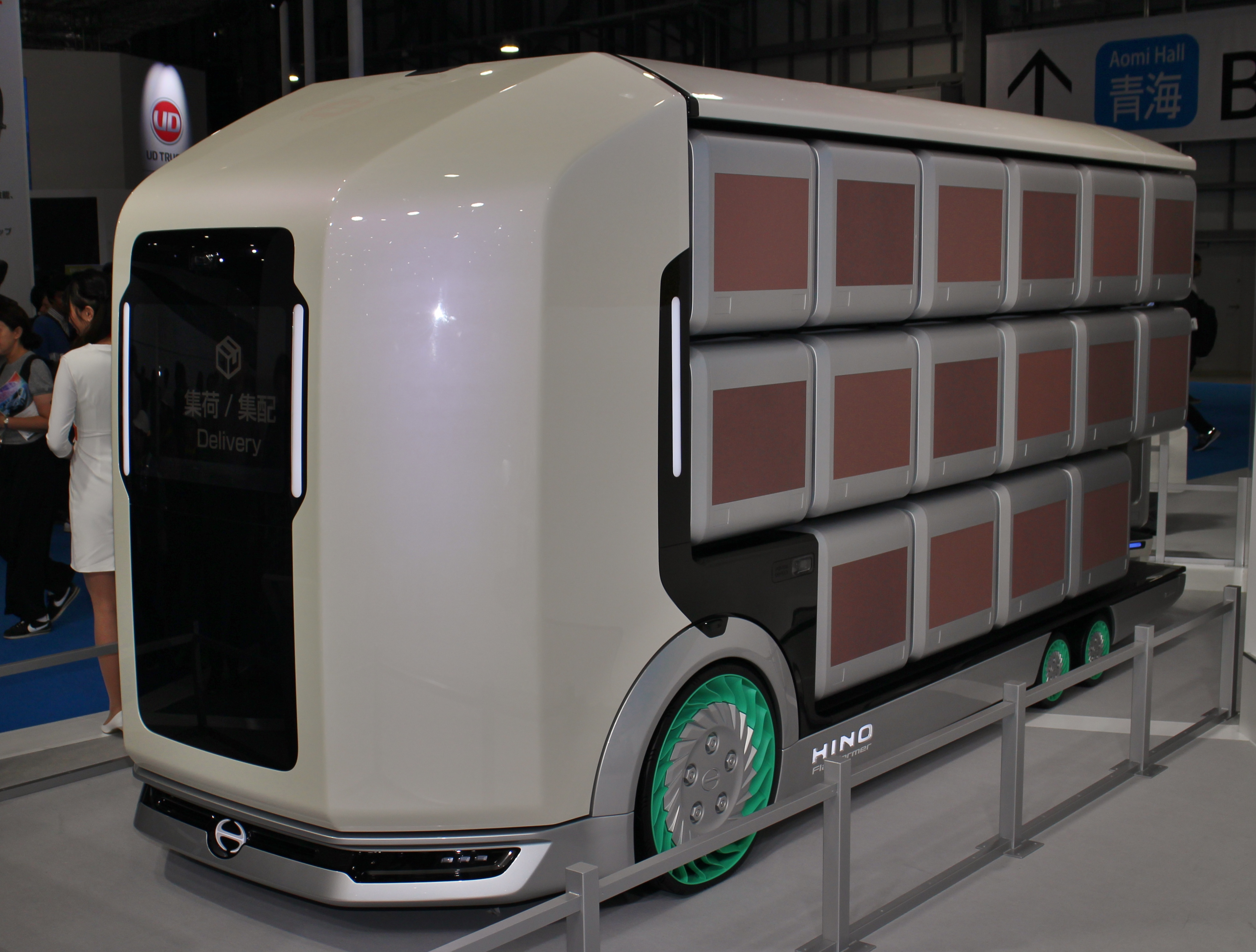
The Hino Flatformer employs the flat REE platform chassis but no corner modules. Pictured with an interchangeable upper body with package delivery cubbies.

An autonomous modular concept vehicle, dubbed Flatformer, was co-developed by REE Automotive and Hino Motors and displayed at the 2019 Tokyo Motor Show. The Flatformer features a flat chassis platform that can have different chassis bodies interchanged autonomously on top of it, such as a body with package delivery cubbies, a body providing retail services, and a body for shuttling passengers.

Autonomous vehicle developer Navya announced in April 2021 it partnered with REE for development of level 4 autonomous vehicles. A concept vehicle for autonomous last-mile delivery, dubbed Leopard, was on display at CES 2022. REE provided a passenger shuttle prototype in 2023 for the Belfast Harbour autonomous shuttle Harlander project. Airbus fitted a production P7-C truck with an A350 cockpit, using it in 2023 and 2024 to reproduce the ground taxiing of aircraft and develop autonomous taxiing capabilities before integrating them into an A350.

==== Trucks ====
Morgan Olson demonstrated its Proxima delivery van in July 2022, a class 5 truck powered by the P7 modules and platform.

== Production ==
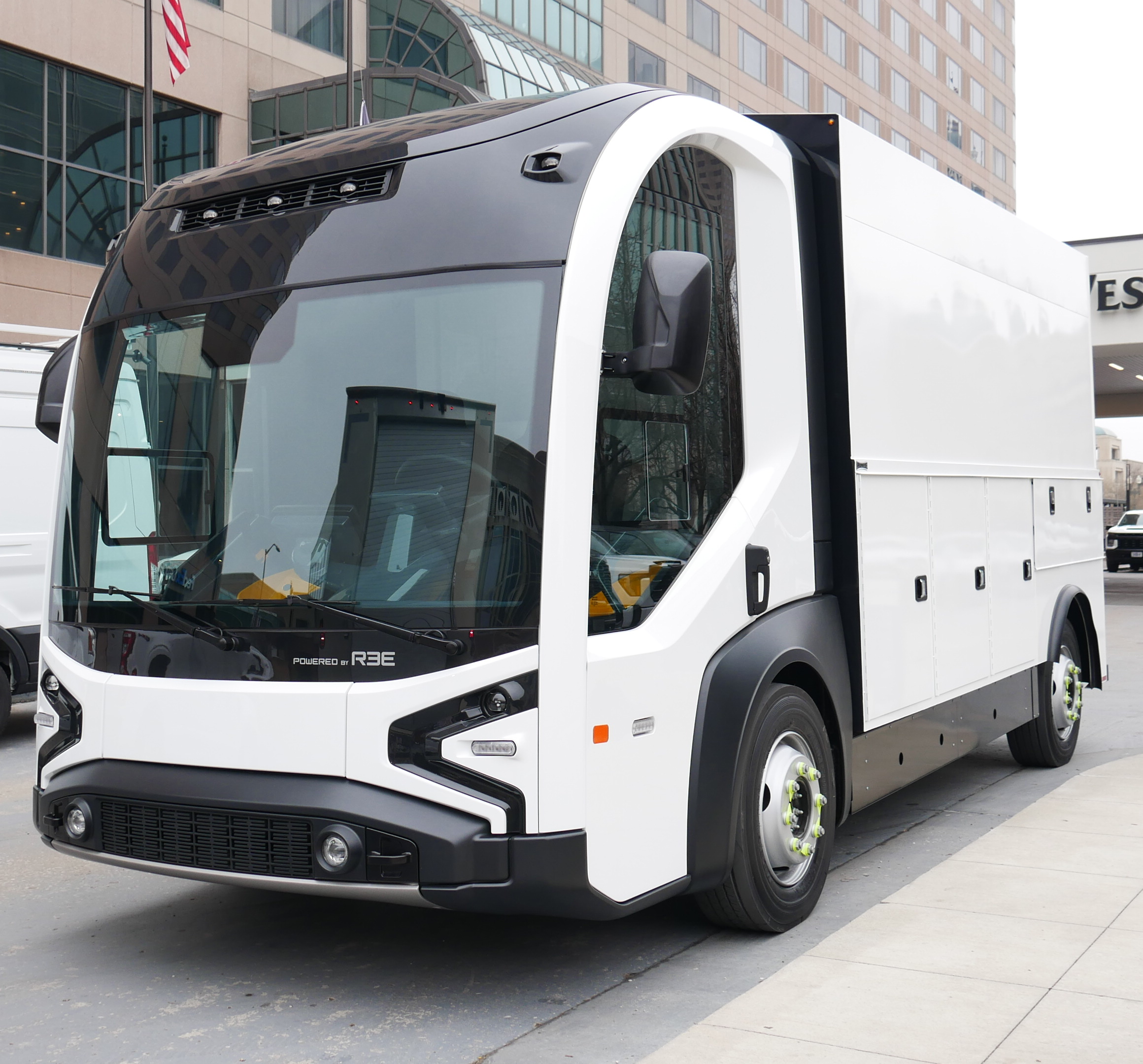
REE Automotive P7-C class 4 electric truck

REE Automotive showcased its first prototype production corner module at CES 2022. Seven months later, the company demonstrated a P7-based class 3 box truck, dubbed the P7-B. At the ACT Expo in May 2023, the company showcased its pre-production P7-C class 4 cab chassis truck.

The prototype P7 corner modules and chassis underwent road tests and long-term durability tests of 20-year-equivalent usage, leading to production-intent prototypes suitable for 350,000 kilometres (220,000 mi) of service life and designed for a baseline of 10 years or 250,000 kilometres (160,000 mi). The P7 platform was initially outfitted with Microvast battery packs that have been tested for a service life of 5000 to 7000 full charge cycles. Platforms may be outfitted with two, three, or four 42 kWh battery packs depending on range and payload considerations. The P7 platform is designed to be outfitted with any supplier's battery packs or power sources as long as they provide 400 volts, allowing for gasoline or diesel vehicles with electric motors. The platform supports 22 kW AC charging and 140 kW DC charging.

=== Product line ===
REE Automotive P7 product line specifications
	P7-S platform	P7-C class 4	P7-C class 5
GVWR (lbs)	10,000–18,300	16,000	18,298
Payload (lbs)	max 10,000	6,000	8,675
Cargo volume (ft^{3})	max 1,270	950	
Range estimate at full payload	max 210 mi	169 mi	155 mi
Turning radius	min 19.7 ft	19.7 ft	19.7 ft
Peak horsepower	536 (134×4)	536	536
Drive	RWD, FWD, AWD	AWD	AWD
Steer	FWS, AWS	AWS	AWS
AC charging	22 kW	14.7 kW	14.7 kW
DC charging	140kW DC	100 kW	
References			

REE offered in 2025 a product line based on its P7 corner modules and platform:

- P7-S, consisting of four corner modules and a platform of varying sizes and weight ratings from class 3 to class 5 with a maximum payload of 10,000 lbs
- P7-C class 4 chassis cab truck
- P7-C class 5 chassis cab truck with all wheel drive, brake, and steer; autonomous emergency braking; torque vectoring, understeering protection, electronic stability control, and traction control; 39-foot turning diameter; electrically-heated windshield; HVAC, ADAS, GPS and navigation; tire-pressure monitoring; ultra-low load-in height; GVWR of 18,298 lbs, and a maximum payload of 8,675 lbs

=== Manufacturing ===
The company's first manufacturing facility was established in 2022 in Coventry, United Kingdom, and was fully built-out by March 2023. REE ceased operations at the Coventry facility in 2025.

The assembly line was divided into automated and manual stations, with the corner modules being carried from one station to the next on autonomous robots. The assembled modules were then attached to a platform chassis, and finally a chassis body was attached. Each facility was designed to initially produce corner modules for up to 10,000 vehicles a year with a single daily work shift. Twenty-five production-intent test vehicles have been manufactured in 2023 for internal validation. The first production P7-C intended for customers was driven off the production line in December 2023.

==== Contract manufacturing ====
The first US production facility in Greater Austin, Texas, was scheduled to begin operations in 2023 with plans to manufacture a few hundred vehicles in 2024, but the build-out of the US production capacity has been delayed as a cost-reduction measure until late 2024 or early 2025. The company revised its production plans in 2024, choosing to utilize the contract manufacturing services of Roush Industries and the supply-chain services of Samvardhana Motherson, reducing its cash burn rate while pushing the start of production to the fourth quarter of 2024. The company as of January 2025 planned the start of customer deliveries of scale-produced vehicles to the first half of 2025, deliver several hundreds of vehicles in the second half of 2025, and ramp up production to the thousands of vehicles in 2026.

=== Sales ===
The first P7 vehicles obtained FMVSS certification and were received by customers in early 2024. The company sold individual trucks to rental companies such as Penske and U-Haul so they can evaluate them for their truck rental fleets. The company had orders for over 900 trucks by December 2024 and planned to start fulfilling orders in the first half of 2025.

=== Production halt and insolvency ===
REE halted production in 2025 after it couldn't secure major automaker partners or large institutional buyers. The company announced in May 2025 that it will pause its production plans and focus instead on their software offerings to OEMs and technology companies. REE petitioned the court for insolvency in July 2026.
