= Justin Allgaier =

American racing driver (born 1986)

- Allgaier at Las Vegas Motor Speedway in 2026
- Born: Justin Myrl Allgaier; June 6, 1986 (age 40); Springfield, Illinois, U.S.
- Achievements: 2024, 2026 NASCAR O'Reilly Auto Parts Series Champion; 2008 ARCA Re/Max Series Champion; 2018, 2026 NASCAR O'Reilly Auto Parts Series Regular Season Champion; Records; All-time NASCAR O'Reilly Auto Parts Series top-tens leader
- Awards: 2009 NASCAR Nationwide Series Rookie of the Year; 2019–2021, 2023–2026 NASCAR Xfinity Series Most Popular Driver

NASCAR Cup Series career
- 87 races run over 10 years
- 2026 position: 48th
- Best finish: 29th (2014)
- First race: 2013 GEICO 400 (Chicagoland)
- Last race: 2026 Cook Out 400 (Martinsville)
| Wins | Top tens | Poles |
|---|---|---|
| 0 | 2 | 0 |

NASCAR O'Reilly Auto Parts Series career
- 537 races run over 17 years
- Car no., team: No. 7 (JR Motorsports)
- 2026 position: 1st
- Best finish: 1st (2024, 2026)
- First race: 2008 Dollar General 300 (Charlotte)
- Last race: 2026 O'Reilly Auto Parts 300 (Homestead)
- First win: 2010 Scotts Turf Builder 300 (Bristol)
- Last win: 2026 Focused Health 250 (Atlanta)
| Wins | Top tens | Poles |
|---|---|---|
| 34 | 326 | 13 |

NASCAR FedEx Freight Truck Series career
- 8 races run over 3 years
- 2008 position: 88th
- Best finish: 56th (2006)
- First race: 2005 Toyota Tundra Milwaukee 200 (Milwaukee)
- Last race: 2008 Built Ford Tough 225 (Kentucky)
| Wins | Top tens | Poles |
|---|---|---|
| 0 | 0 | 0 |

ARCA Menards Series career
- 87 races run over 8 years
- Best finish: 1st (2008)
- First race: 2002 Allen Crowe Memorial 100 (Springfield)
- Last race: 2021 Allen Crowe 100 (Springfield)
- First win: 2006 Allen Crowe Memorial 100 (Springfield)
- Last win: 2008 Hantz Group 300 (Toledo)
| Wins | Top tens | Poles |
|---|---|---|
| 8 | 46 | 2 |

ARCA Menards Series West career
- 1 race run over 1 year
- Best finish: 68th (2014)
- First race: 2014 Carneros 200 (Sonoma)
| Wins | Top tens | Poles |
|---|---|---|
| 0 | 0 | 0 |
- Statistics up to date as of November 8, 2026.

Justin Myrl Allgaier (born June 6, 1986) is an American professional stock car racing driver. He competes full-time in the NASCAR O'Reilly Auto Parts Series, driving the No. 7 Chevrolet Camaro SS for JR Motorsports.

Allgaier is the 2008 ARCA Re/Max Series champion, the 2024 and 2026 NASCAR O'Reilly Auto Parts Series champion, and the 2009 NASCAR Nationwide Series Rookie of the Year.

== Racing career ==
=== Early career and ARCA ===
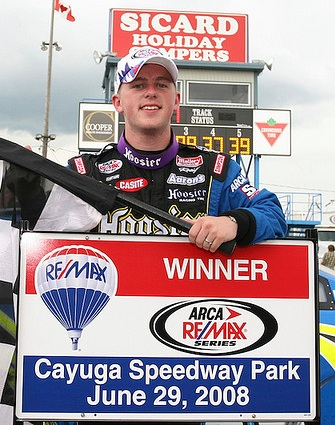
Allgaier in victory lane after winning the ARCA race at Cayuga in 2008, one of his six wins that year en route to the title

Allgaier was born in Springfield, Illinois, and raised in Riverton, Illinois, and began his racing career at the age of five in quarter midgets, winning over one hundred races and five championships. He began stock car racing at the age of 13 in the UMP Late Model Series, where he competed for three seasons. At the age of 16, he made his debut in the ARCA Re/Max Series at the Illinois State Fairgrounds Racetrack, driving the No. 99 Hoosier Tire Midwest/Law Automotive Chevrolet for Ken Schrader; he qualified 29th and finished 17th. He ran two additional races for Kerry Scherer and Bob Schacht, with a best finish of 11th.

Allgaier ran additional ARCA races in 2003, making six starts in the No. 86 owned by his father Mike. He had a sixth-place finish in his second start at Toledo Speedway, and later the best finish of third at Salem Speedway. The next season, he made only five starts but had a second-place place at Toledo. In addition, he was a representative of the United States in the South Pacific Saloon Car Championship, where he had two top-fives. In 2005, Allgaier ran seven races in ARCA, splitting time between cars owned by Hixson Motorsports and Bobby Gerhart Racing. He won his first career pole at Springfield, setting a new track record, and had four top-five finishes. He also made his NASCAR debut in the Craftsman Truck Series, making four starts in the No. 63 MB Motorsports/Dave Porter Ford. He failed to make five races and did not finish higher than 26th. That year, he appeared on the Discovery Channel program, Driver X: The Race For The Ride. The show's premise was Jack Roush searching for new talent to drive Roush Racing-prepared vehicles in NASCAR's top 3 series.

In 2006, Allgaier made his first full-time run in ARCA, ending tenth. He got his first career win at the Illinois State Fairgrounds Racetrack, becoming the first Springfield area resident to win in the 72-year history of championship auto racing at the fairgrounds. He made three more Truck races for MB and had a twenty-first-place finish at Kansas Speedway. In 2007, he won his second career ARCA race at Salem and finished fourth in points. He also won two features in a midget car at Angell Park Speedway and placed 3rd in the Chili Bowl behind Tony Stewart and J. J. Yeley.

Allgaier returned for another full season in ARCA in 2008, driving for his family team once again. He won six races, including the final three, and won the series championship by a slim margin. He broke Frank Kimmel's eight-year streak of winning the championship in that series. He also returned to NASCAR, finishing 21st in a Truck race at Kentucky Speedway.

=== 2008–2013: Nationwide Series ===
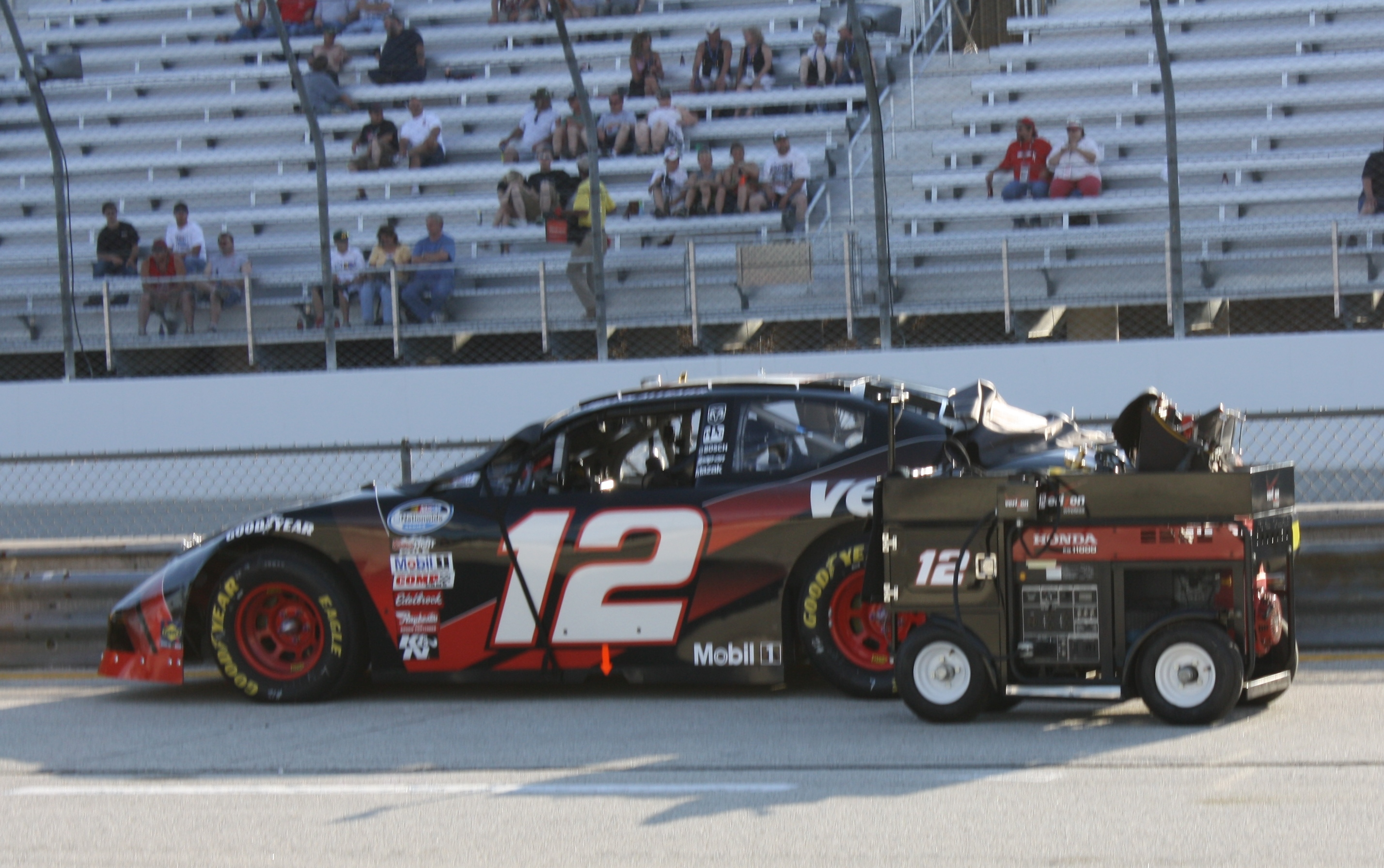
Allgaier's 2009 Nationwide car at the Milwaukee Mile

In May 2008, Allgaier signed a contract with Penske Racing to drive four races in their No. 12 Dodge in the NASCAR Nationwide Series in the final part of the year. His best finish in the Penske Truck Rental Dodge was eleventh at Phoenix.

Allgaier was then signed to drive the car full-time in 2009. Because of the acquisition of Penske Racing sponsor Alltel by Cellco Partners, a joint venture of Verizon and Vodafone, their Sprint Cup sponsorship was legislated out of the sport by NASCAR's agreement with Sprint in that series to prohibit sponsorship by other wireless telephone companies. This allowed Verizon to move its sponsorship to the Nationwide Series, where it is not prohibited, and Allgaier raced a full season with Verizon sponsorship for what became known as Penske Championship Racing. (The name change was made when Bill Davis became a minority owner of the team.) Allgaier won his first career pole in NASCAR at Memphis Motorsports Park.

During the 2009 NAPA 200 in Montreal, Allgaier had the fastest car early in the race and, while running sixth, tried to make a pass on Canadian road ace Ron Fellows and Kyle Busch. Instead, he caused a wreck that took both him and Fellows out of the race and damaged Busch's hopes of winning. After this incident, Allgaier took some lessons at Fellows' road racing driving school to better his road course skills, which turned out to come in handy in the following years when he won several Nationwide/Xfinity Series road course races.

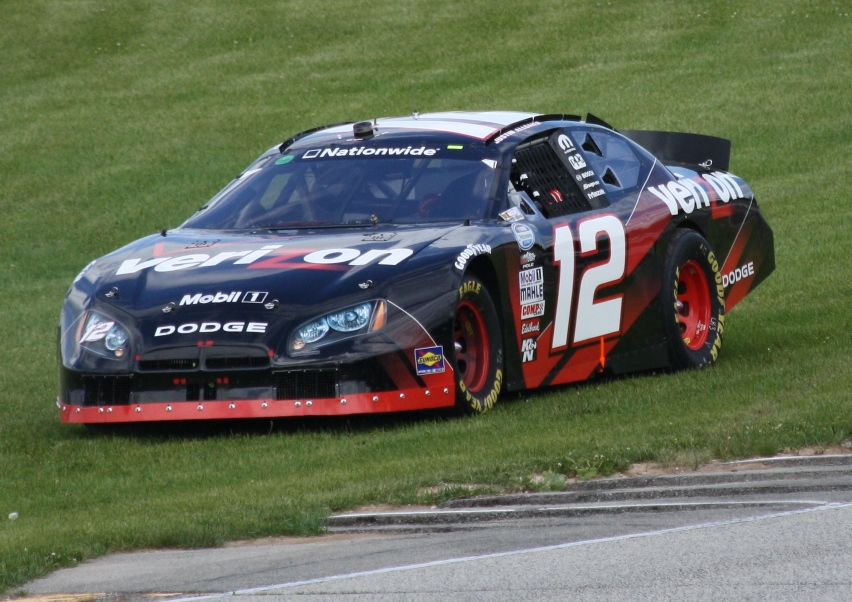
Allgaier slides his car through the grass at Road America in 2010

In 2010, Allgaier had a similar season but would win his first Nationwide Series race at Bristol Motor Speedway on March 20 and improve to fourth in the standings at the end of the year. He was the highest-finishing series regular in the series standings that year, as the top three finishers in points were all full-time Cup Series drivers.

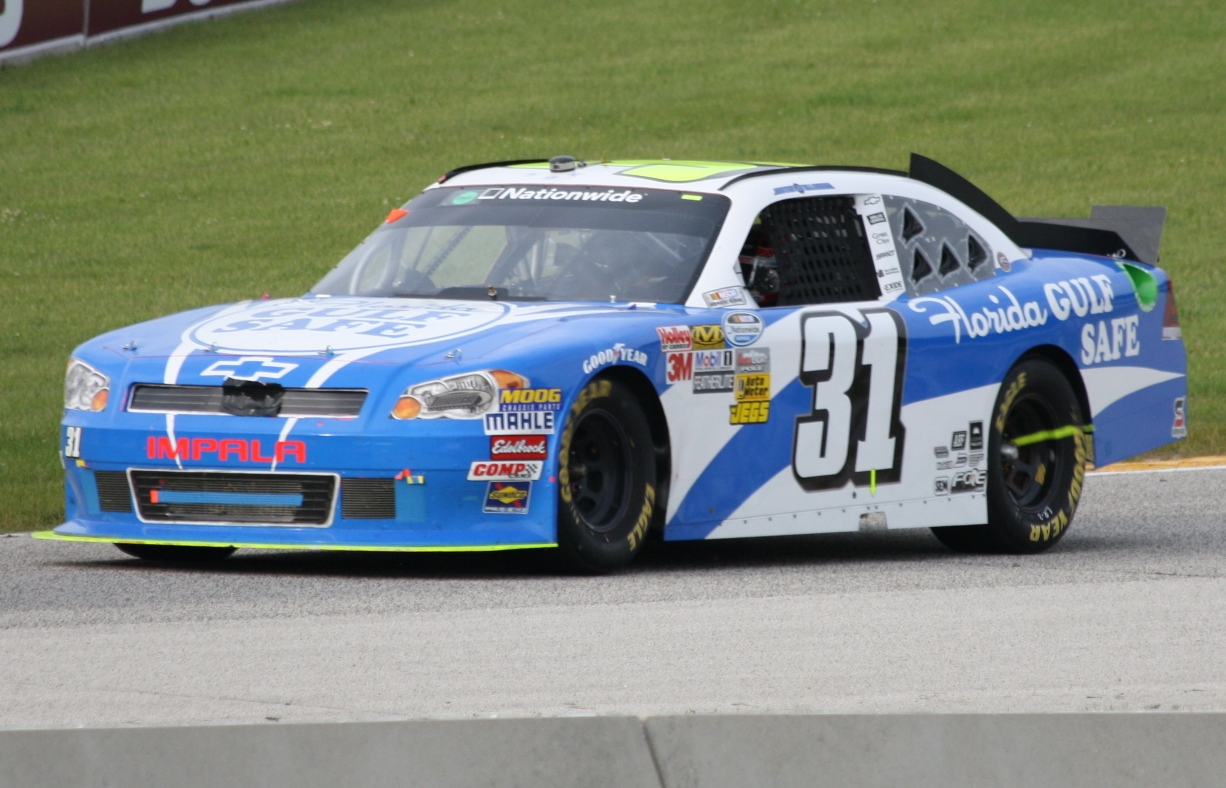
Allgaier in the Road America race in 2011, which he nearly won

Allgaier was rumored to be moving up to the Sprint Cup Series in 2011 with Penske to drive the No. 12 Cup car, replacing Brad Keselowski, who was moving to the team's No. 2 car. However, Penske had to shut down the No. 12 due to a lack of sponsorship, and Allgaier would remain in the Nationwide Series, moving to Turner Motorsports where he would drive the team's new No. 31 Chevrolet Impala. In the inaugural STP 300 at Chicagoland Speedway after passing Carl Edwards, who ran out of fuel on the last lap, Allgaier won the race. Even though Allgaier ran out of fuel himself after, he was able to cross the finish line before third-place Trevor Bayne to finish first. He almost won at Road America but ran out of fuel on the caution on the final lap and finished nineteenth.

In 2012, Allgaier returned to the renamed Turner Scott Motorsports; he passed Jacques Villeneuve on the final lap to win the NAPA Auto Parts 200 at Circuit Gilles Villeneuve in Montreal, Quebec.

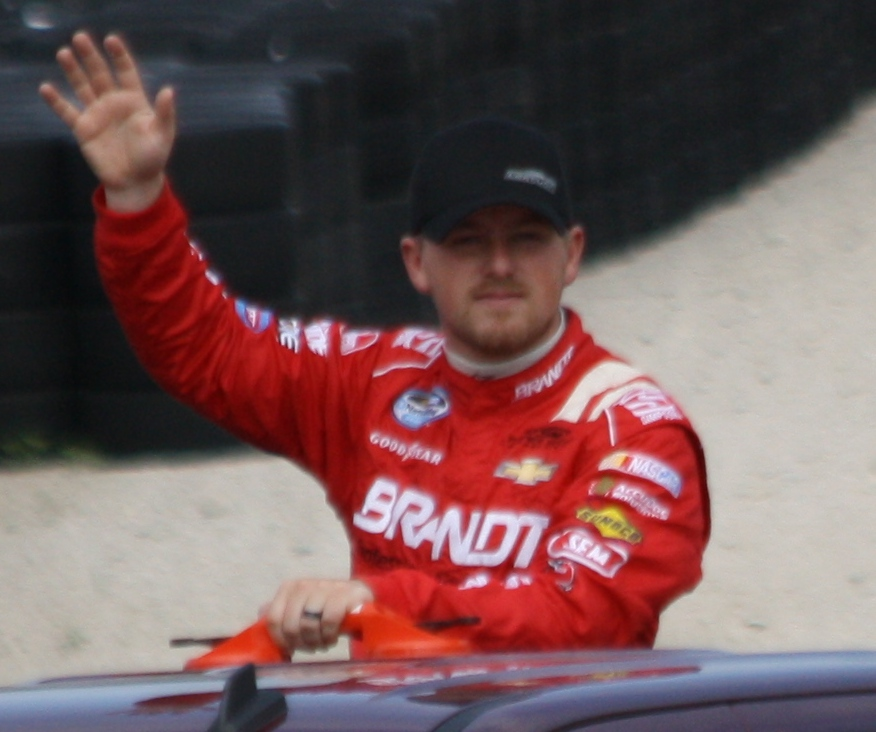
Allgaier in 2013

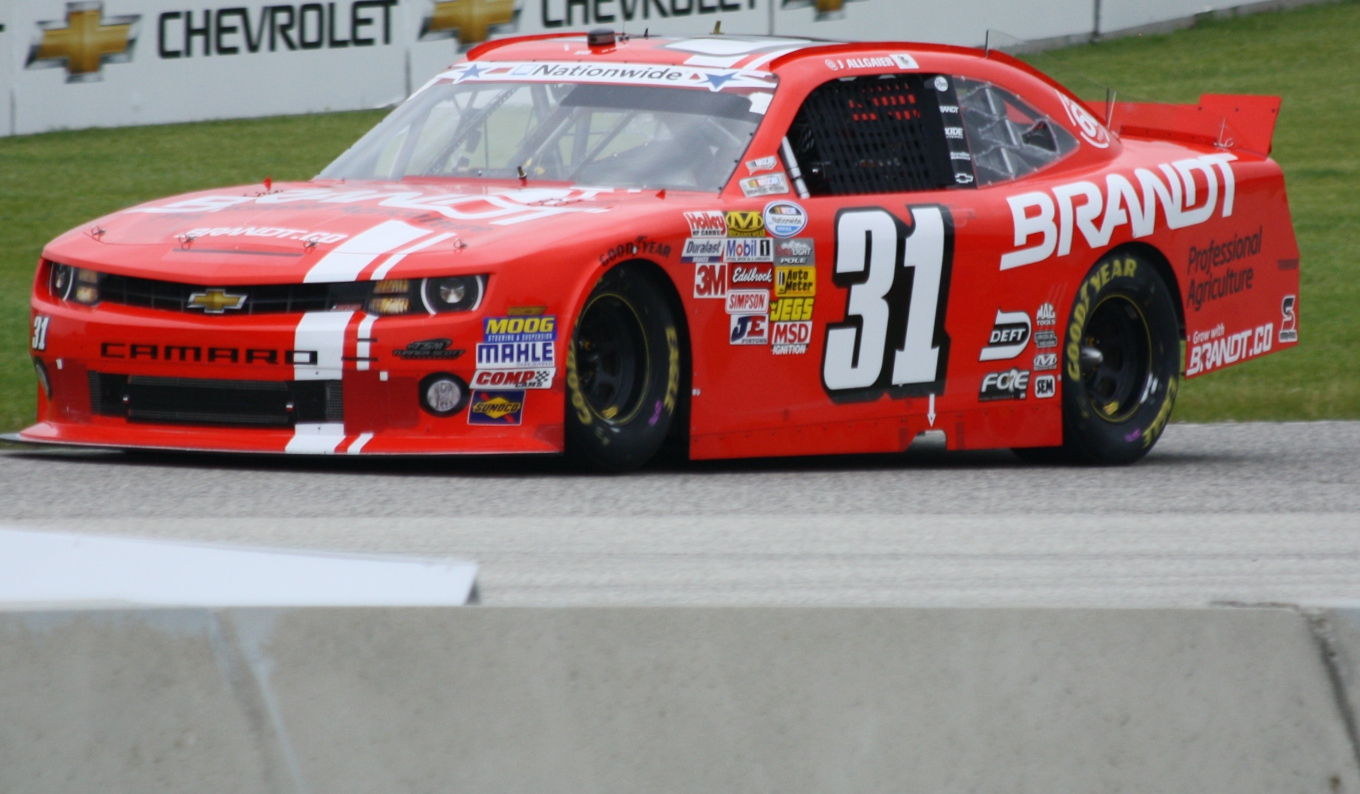
Allgaier's No. 31 car at Road America in 2013

In August 2013, it was announced that Allgaier would make his NASCAR Sprint Cup Series debut the following month at Chicagoland Speedway, driving there and in two other races in Phoenix Racing's No. 51 Chevrolet, which had just been purchased by Turner Scott co-owner Harry Scott Jr. Allgaier finished 27th in his debut, and ran races for the team later in the year at Kansas Speedway, Talladega Superspeedway and Phoenix International Raceway.

=== 2014: First Cup season ===
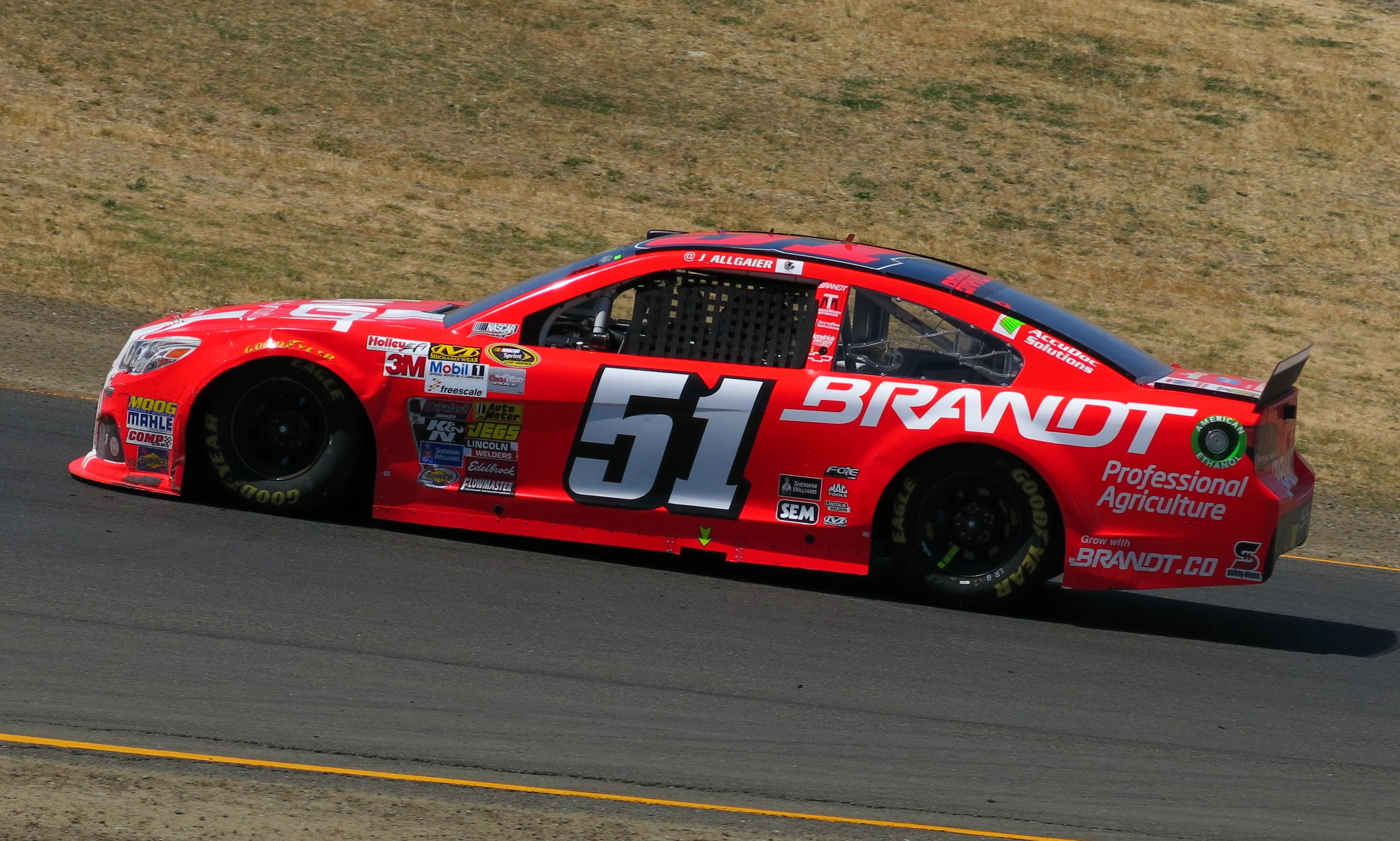
Allgaier's No. 51 car at Sonoma Raceway in 2014

In January 2014, it was announced that Allgaier would compete full-time for Rookie of the Year in the 2014 NASCAR Sprint Cup Series, driving for the now-renamed HScott Motorsports in the No. 51 Chevrolet SS.

Allgaier led four laps in the Daytona 500 and crashed with seven laps to go. He finished 27th. After consecutive top-twenty finishes, Allgaier had a great finish in the Food City 500, avoiding several wrecks to finish 17th. At Talladega, Allgaier nearly won his first Cup series victory in the Aaron's 499, running in the top five and contending for victory with nine laps to go. He lost drafting help from Kurt Busch and, as a result, lost multiple spots, finishing 27th.

Allgaier led fifteen laps during the first Pocono race in early June. Taking the lead with less than 35 laps to go, Allgaier led until a yellow came out with nineteen laps to go, forcing Allgaier to make a pit stop.

At Daytona in the Coke Zero 400, Allgaier ran in the top ten early in the race. He was caught up in "The Big One" that took out over 27 cars. Allgaier, while trying to avoid wrecking, tapped Kyle Busch, who was already wrecking. Allgaier's contact caused Busch to come back onto the apron and be t-boned by Cole Whitt.

Allgaier missed the field for the GEICO 500, failing to qualify for the first time in his Cup career. The new restrictor-plate qualifying process became controversial amongst drivers and fans because many drivers complained that they barely managed to make the show because of the system. However, in the following race at Martinsville, Allgaier would take the lead late in the race, leading four laps and finishing seventeenth. Allgaier finished 29th in the Cup Series standings for 2014 and third in the Rookie of the Year standings behind Austin Dillon and Kyle Larson.

=== 2015 ===
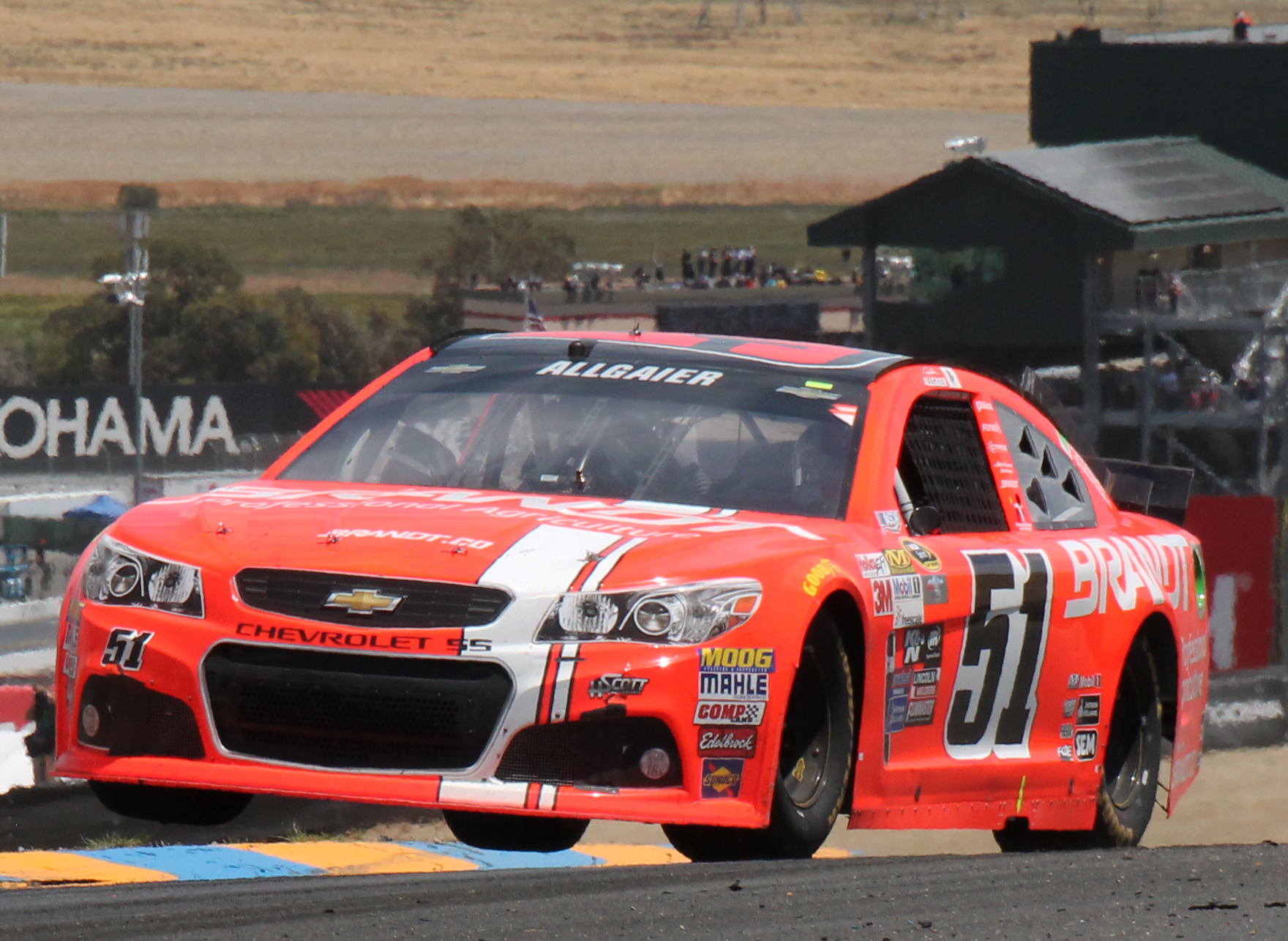
Allgaier racing at Sonoma Raceway in 2015

Allgaier began his season with a crash in the Daytona 500. He rebounded at Phoenix three weeks later, running in the top ten late. After contact with Tony Stewart, Allgaier faded in the waning laps, finishing 18th. The next week at Auto Club Speedway, Allgaier ran as high as eighth and finished twelfth, his career-best finish at the time. He scored his first top ten at Bristol in the No. 51, finishing eighth. He then finished 18th at Richmond after spending most of the race running as high as second, and while suffering from a stomach cramp. Allgaier had some good runs at short tracks, such as the second Bristol race and both Martinsville races, but failed to record another top-ten.

On October 2, 2015, it was announced that Allgaier parted ways with HScott Motorsports, and was replaced in 2016 by Clint Bowyer. On October 28, 2015, it was announced that Allgaier would take his sponsor Brandt to drive the No. 7 for JR Motorsports full-time in the Xfinity Series season in 2016, replacing Regan Smith.

Allgaier finished 30th in the Cup Series standings, one spot short of matching his career-best season result.

=== 2016: Return to Xfinity Series and sports car debut ===
After talking to Dale Earnhardt Jr. during driver intros at Darlington Raceway in the same pickup truck, Allgaier formed a connection with Earnhardt and eventually signed to drive with JR Motorsports for the 2016 season. Allgaier started his season on a good note. While his teammate Chase Elliott won the season-opening PowerShares QQQ 300 at Daytona, Allgaier finished twelfth. Allgaier picked up two top-tens in the next two races at Atlanta and Las Vegas. He led fifteen laps in Atlanta and finished ninth in Las Vegas. Allgaier had his best finish of the spring at Talladega during the Sparks Energy 300, in which he led one lap and took advantage of Joey Logano's final lap wreck to finish second behind his teammate Elliott Sadler, giving JRM a 1–2 finish.

Allgaier appeared to have won the July race in Daytona. After passing Aric Almirola on the final lap, Allgaier led to the yellow-and-checkered flags to finish first. NASCAR determined that the yellow had flown with Almirola leading, dropping Allgaier to a second-runner-up of the season, while giving the win to Almirola. Allgaier later finished second yet again at the Food City 300 after passing Kyle Larson on the final lap to place second to Austin Dillon, his third runner-up finish of the season.

On August 20, Allgaier returned to the Cup Series to drive the No. 46 Chevrolet at the Bass Pro Shops NRA Night Race, replacing former HScott teammate Michael Annett after he suffered from flu-like symptoms. Allgaier got into a crash with Kyle Busch when Allgaier wrecked at the same time as Busch.

Allgaier made his Porsche GT3 Cup Brasil debut in 2016 as a co-driver for a team that is sponsored by his NASCAR Xfinity Series sponsor, Brandt Agriculture. He made two starts in the Brandt-sponsored No. 7 Porsche with Miguel Paludo as the driver, both of which were in endurance races, the Goiânia and Interlagos races.

Even though he went winless throughout the whole season, he ended up finishing third in the final standings behind Elliott Sadler and eventual champion Daniel Suárez.

=== 2017 ===
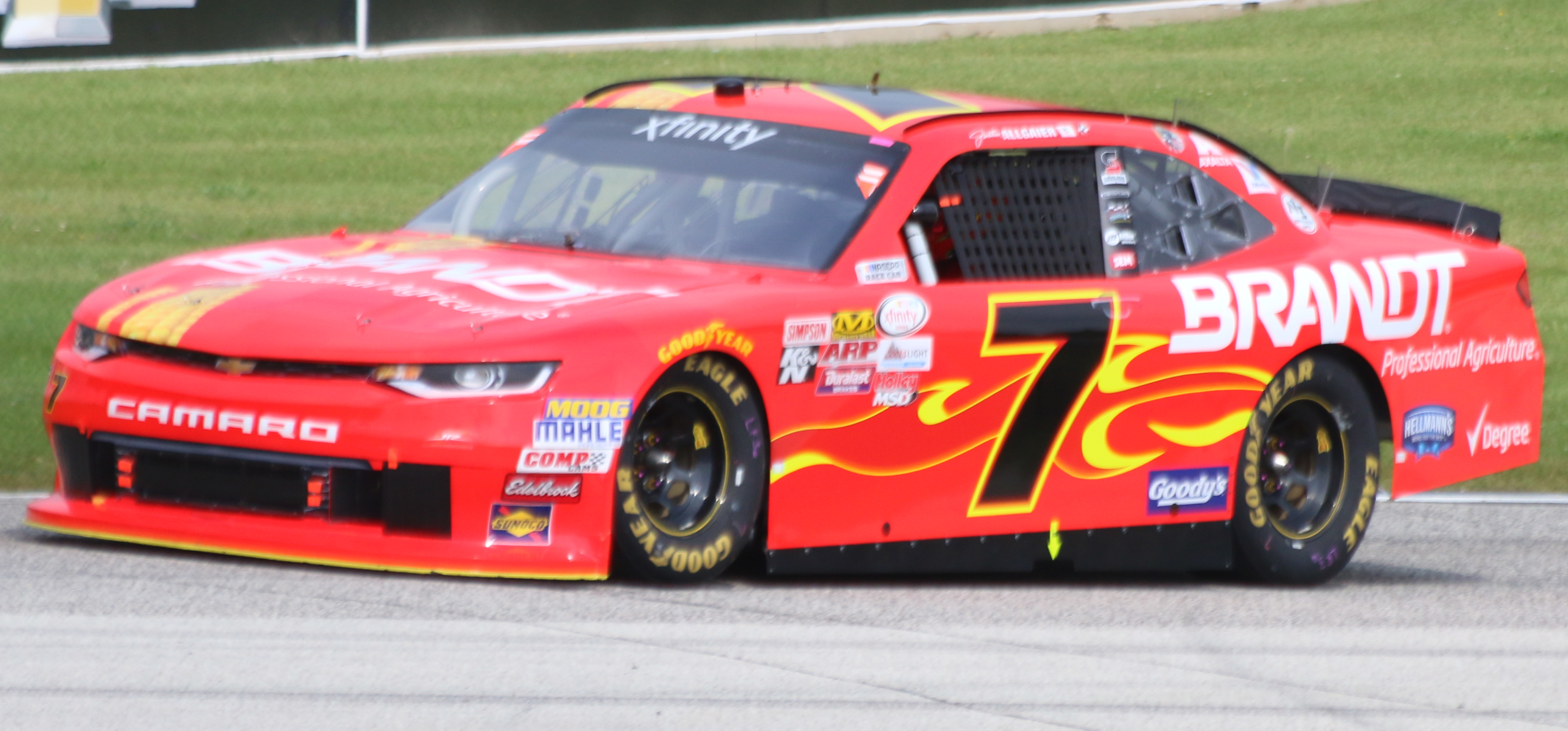
Allgaier's No. 7 Camaro at Road America

Allgaier continued with JR Motorsports for the 2017 NASCAR Xfinity Series. He led late in the DC Solar 200 at Phoenix and took the lead from Austin Dillon with less than thirty laps to go and held off Ryan Blaney on a final restart to win his first race in five years. With the win, Allgaier made the NASCAR playoffs and also picked up a bonus of $100,000 in the Dash 4 Cash program. His second win of the season came at Chicagoland Speedway in September; it was the first time in his career he won more than once in a season. For the second year, Allgaier made the playoffs with his teammates Elliott Sadler, William Byron and Michael Annett and despite a 33rd-place finish at Charlotte in the playoffs, he finished third in the final standings again while giving JR Motorsports a 1-2-3 finish in the standings for the first time with Allgaier finishing third, Sadler finishing second and Byron winning the championship.

Allgaier finished seventh in his sole Porsche GT3 Cup Brasil start, at the season-ending Autodromo Jose Carlos Pace Interlagos 500 km round as a co-driver for Paludo.

=== 2018 ===
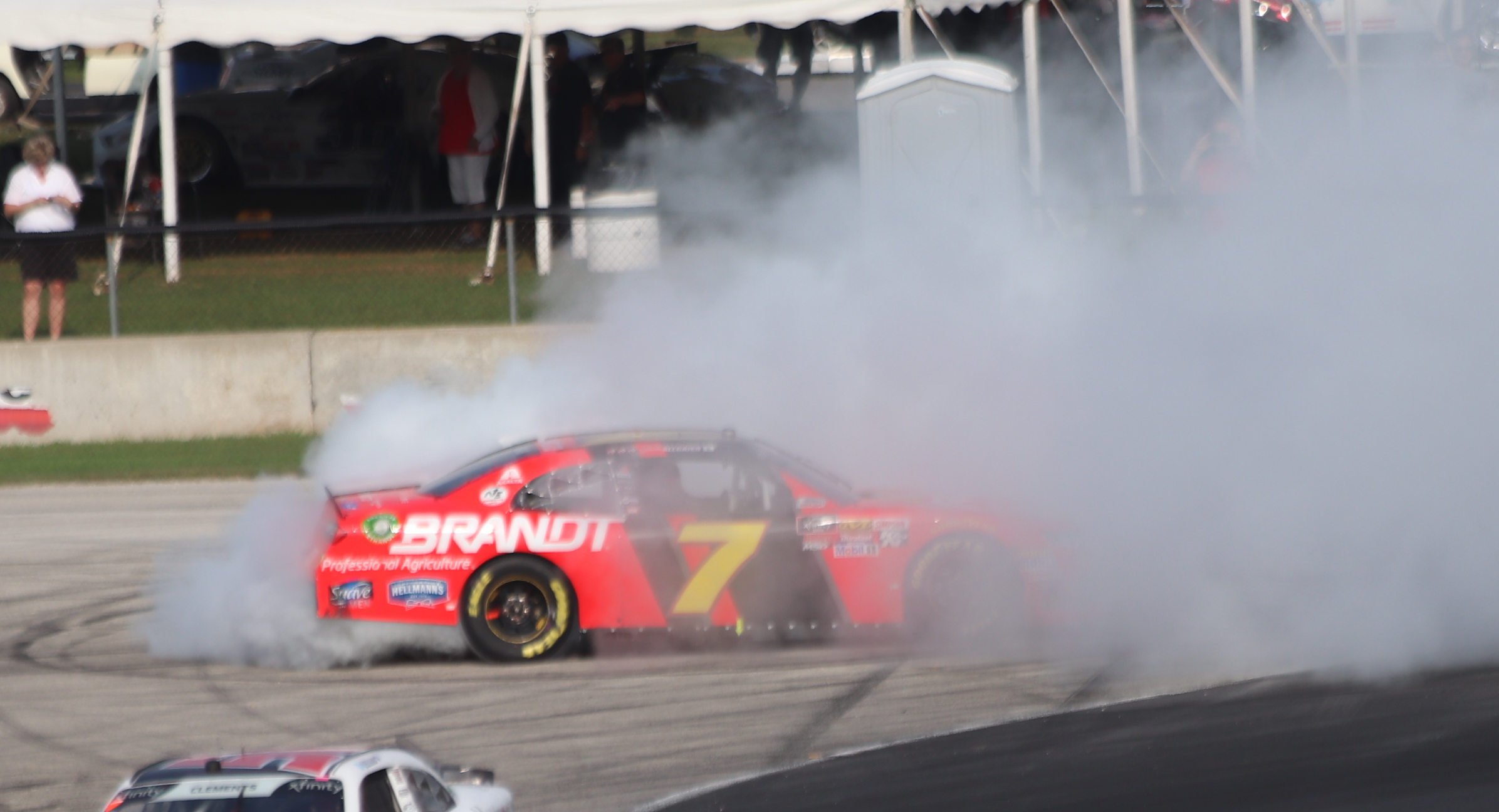
Allgaier does burnouts after winning the 2018 Johnsonville 180 race at Road America.

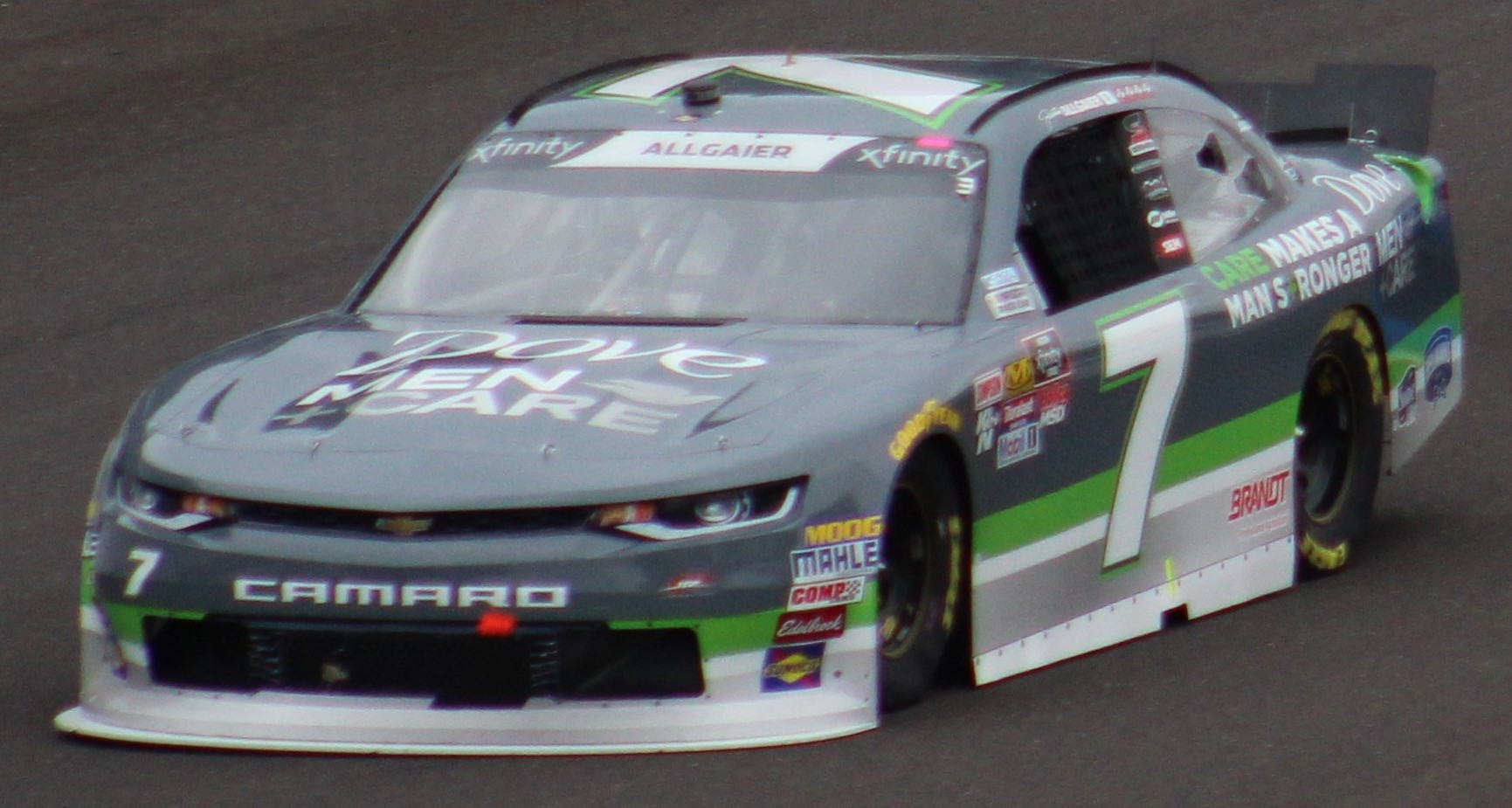
Allgaier's race-winning No. 7 car at Indianapolis in 2018

Allgaier returned in the No. 7 for the 2018 NASCAR Xfinity Series season. After three second-place finishes at Phoenix, California, and Bristol, he picked up his first win of the season at Dover after holding off teammate Elliott Sadler; However, he failed post-race inspection, leading to a 25-point penalty and losing six playoff points as well as the win not counting towards the playoffs. Later in the season, after two dismal finishes of 32nd and 37th at Charlotte and Pocono, he finished ninth in a rain-shortened race at Michigan, followed by a dominating performance at Iowa, where he led the most laps and won both stages en route to his second win of the season. He then went on to earn his third win of the season at Mid-Ohio and at Road America two weeks later, he earned his fourth win of the season as well as inherited the points lead after Christopher Bell had issues near the end and two weeks later at Indianapolis Motor Speedway after the race was delayed two days due to rain, he led a race-high 41 laps en route to his fifth win of the season. A week later, Allgaier would win the 2018 Regular Season Championship. However, he was eliminated in the Round of 8 after the season's penultimate race at ISM Raceway and finished with a seventh place points finish.

Allgaier finished fifth in his sole Porsche GT3 Cup Brasil start, again at Interlagos, again teaming with Paludo.

=== 2019 ===
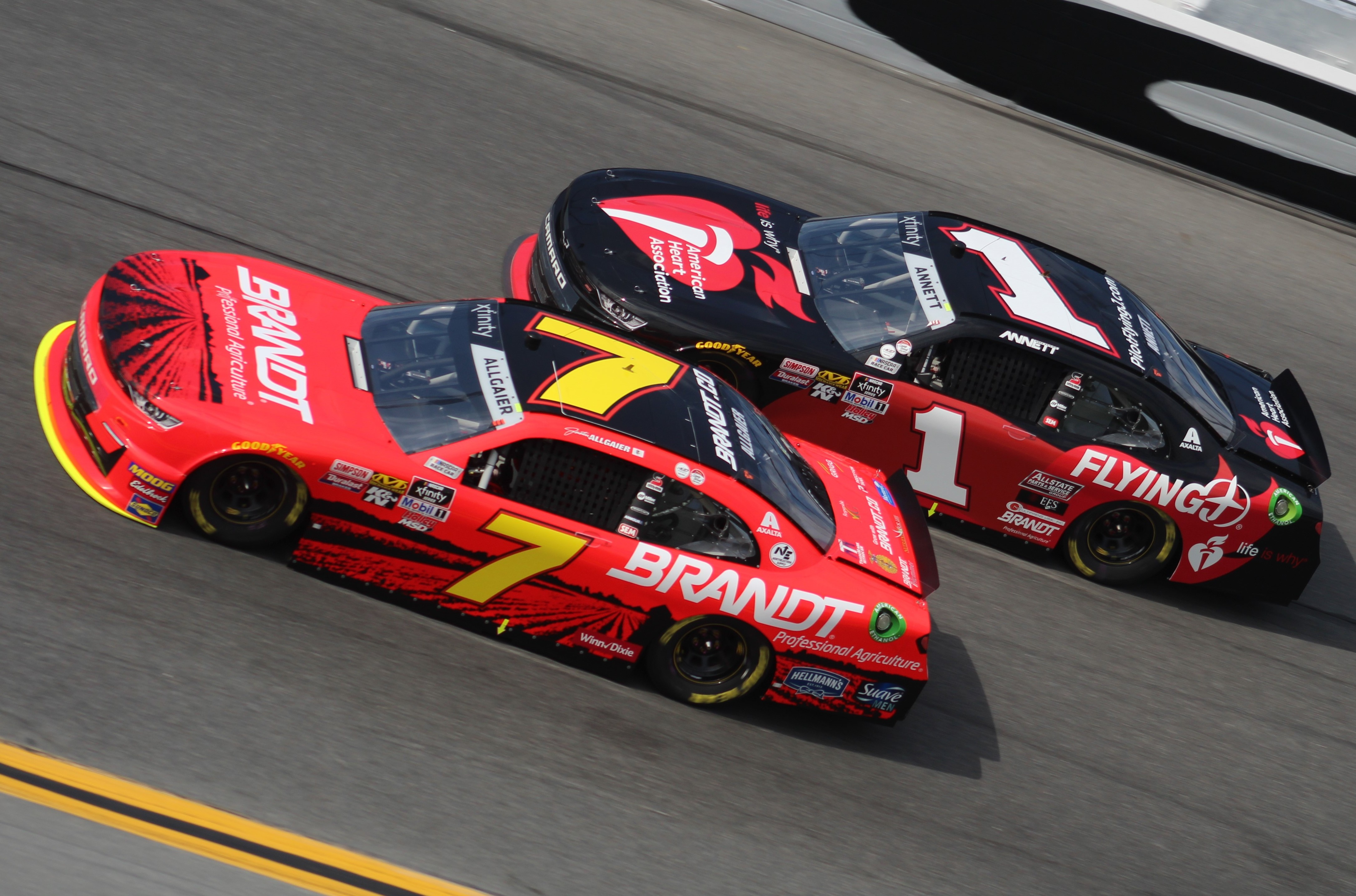
Allgaier racing his JR Motorsports teammate Michael Annett at Daytona in 2019

At Watkins Glen International in August, Ross Chastain sent Allgaier spinning off track in the bus stop section of the circuit. Allgaier, believing that the move was intentional, sent Chastain into the guardrail in that same portion of the track later in the race, forcing Chastain out of the event. Chastain said that his end of the incident was a mistake on his part, while Allgaier cited instances at Daytona earlier in 2019 and Las Vegas in 2019 as proof that Chastain was a dirty driver.

Again, Allgaier made starts in the Porsche GT3 Cup Brasil Endurance rounds as Paludo's co-driver when dates did not conflict. In the 2019 season, the dates were the Goiânia and Interlagos rounds. At Goiânia, Allgaier led during his stint midway through the 300 km race, but after handing the car back to Paludo for the final stint, Confederação Brasileira de Automobilismo officials black-flagged the team for Allgaier violating track limits when only two tires were below the pit entrance line; series rules require all four tires below it.

Allgaier won the final race of the Round of 8 at Phoenix to advance to the Championship 4, his third appearance in the last four years and 1st victory of the season after five second-place finishes throughout the year. He finished the 2019 season fourth in points after finishing fourteenth at Homestead.

=== 2020 ===
The 2020 Xfinity season began at Daytona with a crash involving Allgaier and Jeremy Clements on lap 47. Although he recorded stage wins at Las Vegas, Phoenix, Bristol, and Pocono, he struggled with poor luck throughout the first half of the season.

On July 3, Hendrick Motorsports announced Allgaier would take over Jimmie Johnson's No. 48 Cup Series car at Indianapolis after Johnson tested positive for the coronavirus. He finished 37th after being involved in a multi-car accident on pit road on lap twelve. Johnson was cleared to return for the following week's Kentucky race.

Allgaier swept the Richmond Raceway doubleheader. He finished out the season sixth in points, but due to good runs in the final races and misfortunes of his competitors, he made the Championship 4 for the sixth time in his career. He finished second of the Championship 4 drivers in the finale at Phoenix Raceway, with three wins on the season.

=== 2021 ===
Allgaier had only one top-twenty finish, a fourteenth-place finish at Las Vegas, in the first four races of the 2021 Xfinity season. However, after an eighth-place finish at Phoenix, he picked up his first win at Atlanta Motor Speedway, beating out Cup champion Martin Truex Jr.. He then won three races later for the first time at Darlington Raceway.

In June, Allgaier joined the Stadium Super Trucks' practice and qualifying at Mid-Ohio Sports Car Course (where they were supporting the Xfinity Series). He set the sixth-best time of eight drivers.

On June 27, Allgaier was called on again as a substitute replacement in a Cup Series race, this time for Justin Haley in the Spire Motorsports No. 77 in the second race of the Cup Series doubleheader at Pocono after Haley had to recover from a hard crash in the Xfinity race earlier in the same day.

=== 2022 ===
Allgaier ended a 34-race winless streak at Darlington. Allgaier would also win at Nashville and New Hampshire. At Martinsville, Allgaier finished fifth and was able to advance to the Championship 4 Race at Phoenix after Ty Gibbs wrecked Joe Gibbs Racing teammate Brandon Jones on the final overtime-lap for the race win. Allgaier would finish third at Phoenix, thereby finishing third in the points standings.

=== 2023 ===
Allgaier started the 2023 season with a third-place finish at Daytona. He scored his first win of the season at Charlotte. Allgaier beat Sheldon Creed by 0.005 seconds in double overtime at the Daytona night race. During the playoffs, he won at Bristol and Martinsville to make the Championship 4. Allgaier finished third at Phoenix and second in the points standings.

=== 2024: Championship season ===
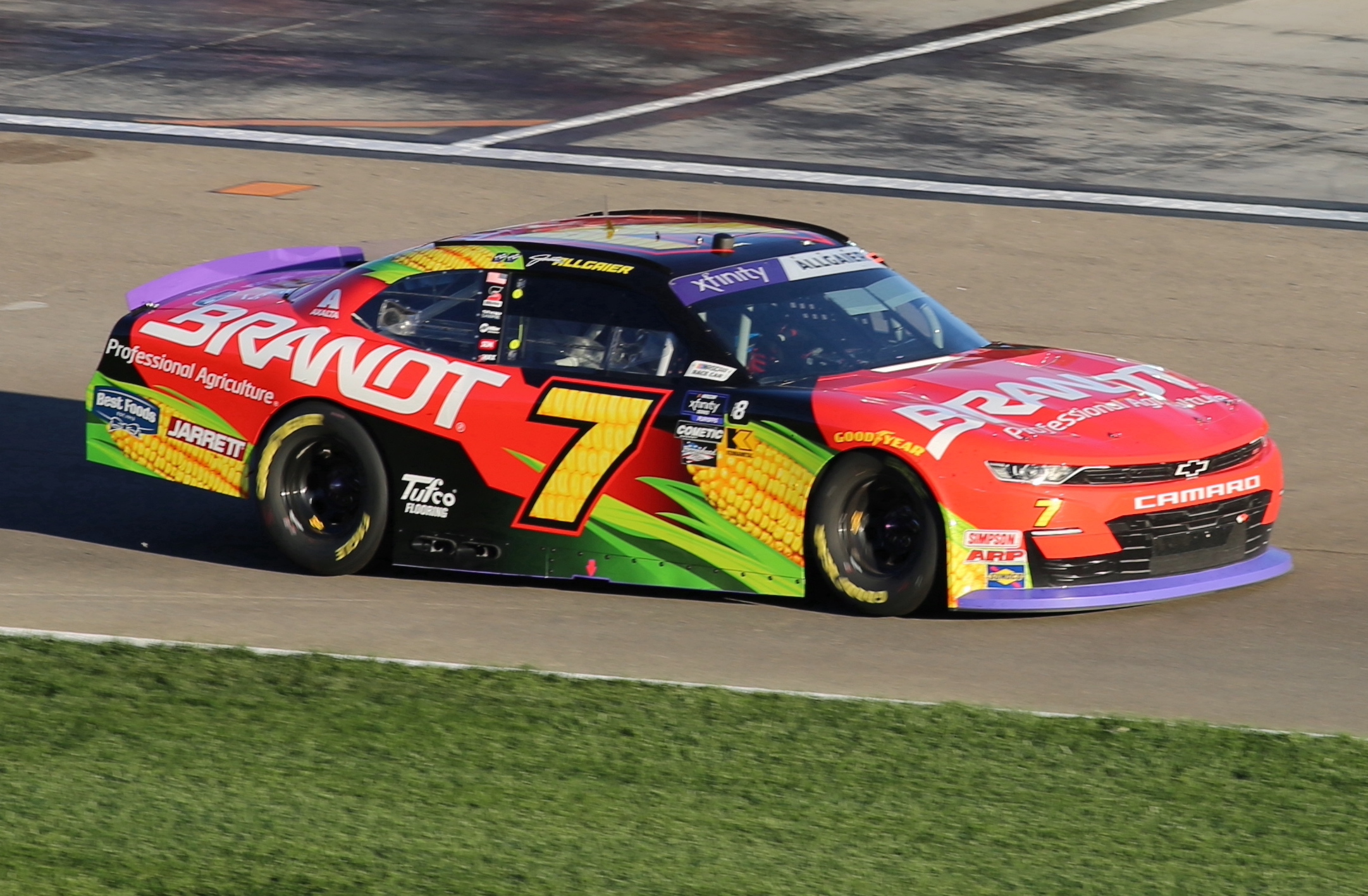
Allgaier's No. 7 car at Las Vegas Motor Speedway in 2024

Allgaier started the 2024 season with an eighth-place finish at Daytona. Allgaier dominated at Darlington, winning Stages 1 and 2 before taking the checkered flag. He scored his second win of the season at Michigan. Despite not winning a race during the playoffs, Allgaier stayed consistent enough to make the Championship 4 on points. Allgaier finished second to Riley Herbst at Phoenix and claimed his first Xfinity Series championship after fourteen seasons.

On May 26, Allgaier was called on as a relief driver in the Cup Series again, starting the Coca-Cola 600 in place of Kyle Larson in the Hendrick Motorsports No. 5 after weather delayed the Indianapolis 500, which Larson had driven in earlier that day. Allgaier would remain in the car for the entirety of the rain-shortened event, finishing 13th.

On October 25, Allgaier signed a contract extension with JR Motorsports that will last until 2026.

=== 2025: Return to the Cup Series ===
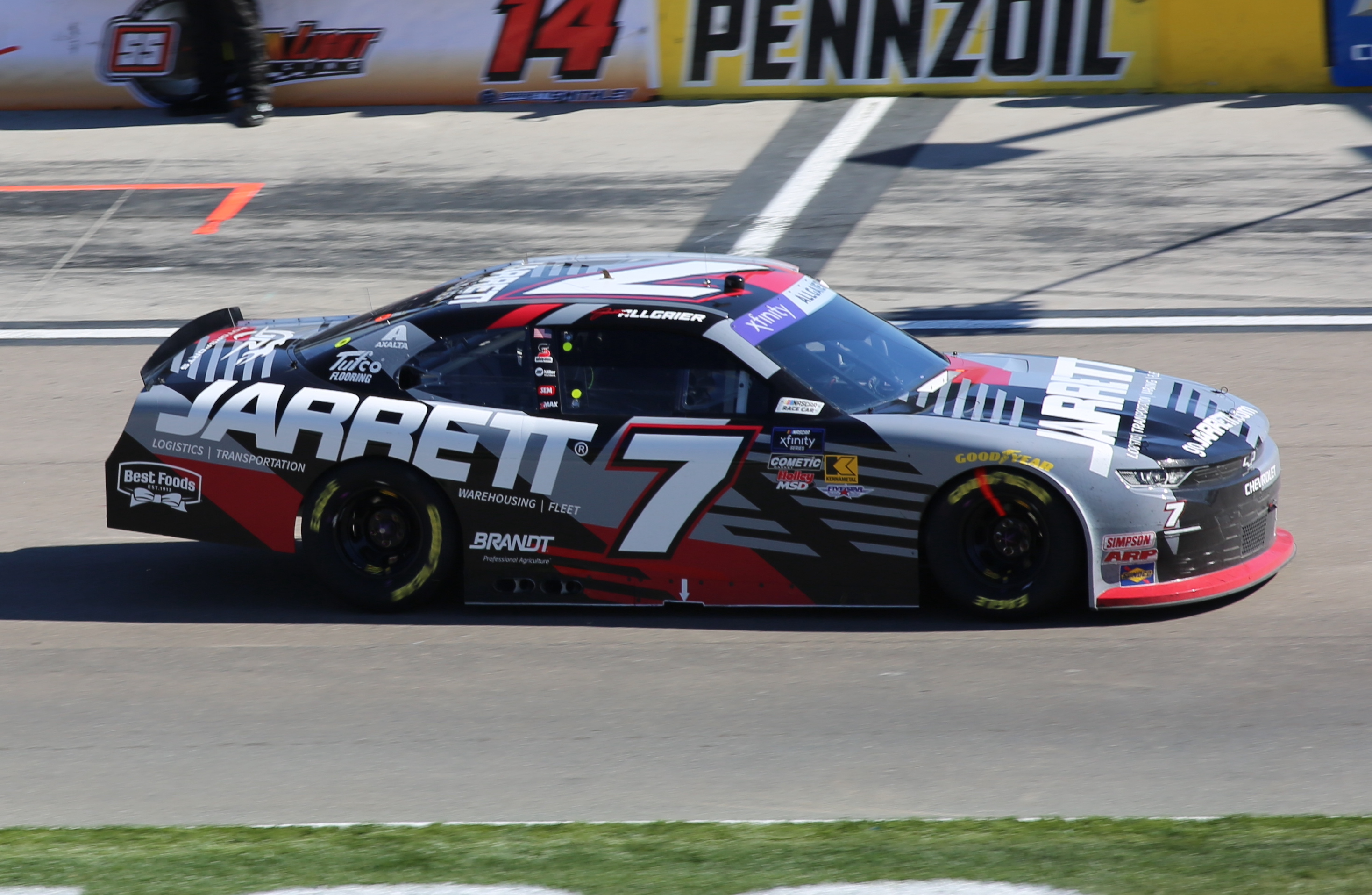
Allgaier's No. 7 car at Las Vegas Motor Speedway in 2025

On January 15, 2025, JR Motorsports announced that they would be making their Cup Series debut in the Daytona 500, with Allgaier behind the wheel of the No. 40 car and Chris Stapleton's Traveller Whiskey as the team sponsor. Allgaier managed to race his way into the race after finishing ninth in Duel 1 and would start nineteenth in the 500. Allgaier managed to finish the race in ninth, his first top-ten finish in the Cup Series since Bristol in 2015, as well as JRM's first top-ten.

In the Xfinity Series, Allgaier started the 2025 season with an eighteenth-place finish at Daytona. A month later, he scored back-to-back wins at Las Vegas and Homestead. He would earn his third win of the season at Nashville. He ultimately finished the season 3rd in the standings behind Jesse Love and Connor Zilisch.

=== 2026: Second championship ===
On November 14, 2025, JR Motorsports announced it will enter the 2026 Daytona 500, with Allgaier once again driving the No. 40 car and Traveller Whiskey returning as the sponsor.

In February 2026, Allgaier competed in the Daytona 500 and was involved in a multi-car crash that collected around 20 cars after contact with Denny Hamlin during Stage 2 of the race.

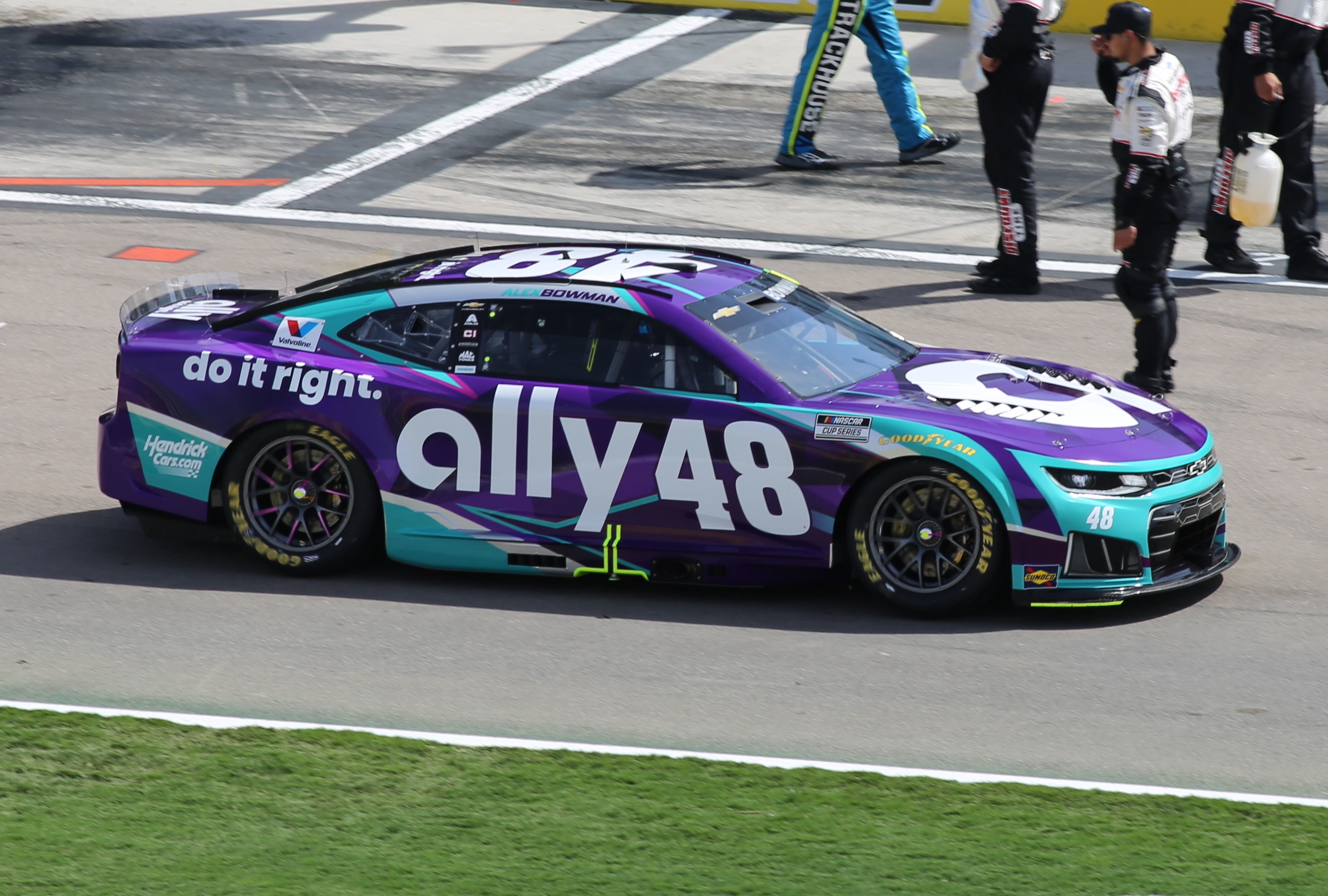
Allgaier's No. 48 car at Las Vegas Motor Speedway in 2026

Due to Alex Bowman's vertigo symptoms sustained at Austin, Allgaier ran the No. 48 from Las Vegas to Bristol.

In the O'Reilly Auto Parts Series, Allgaier won at Phoenix, Darlington, Martinsville, Nashville, Pocono and Atlanta II to become the regular season champion. Allgaier was consistent in "The Chase" to earn his second series title.

=== 2027 ===
On July 16, 2026, Allgaier talked about signing a contract extension with JR Motorsports for 2027 and beyond. It was officially announced on November 3 as a multi-year deal.

== Personal life ==
Allgaier went to Lincoln Land Community College where he majored in engineering from 2004 to 2006. He is married to Ashley, and they have two daughters, Harper and Willow.

Allgaier is nicknamed "Little Gator" as a play on his last name and his father being dubbed "Gator".

After winning the 2024 NASCAR Xfinity Series championship, December 14 is recognized as "Justin Allgaier Day" in Springfield, Illinois, and December 9, 2025, is also known as "Justin Allgaier Day" in the entire state of Illinois.

Allgaier made a cameo on season 3 episode 8 of Wild Cards.

== Motorsports career results ==
=== Racing career summary ===
| Season | Series | Team | Races | Wins | Top 5 | Top 10 | Points | Position |
|---|---|---|---|---|---|---|---|---|
| 2002 | ARCA Re/Max Series | Allgaier Motorsports | 3 | 0 | 0 | 0 | 465 | 62nd |
| 2003 | ARCA Re/Max Series | Allgaier Motorsports | 6 | 0 | 1 | 2 | 915 | 27th |
| 2004 | ARCA Re/Max Series | Allgaier Motorsports | 5 | 0 | 2 | 3 | 835 | 35th |
| 2005 | ARCA Re/Max Series | Allgaier Motorsports | 8 | 0 | 4 | 5 | 1380 | 31st |
| 2005 | NASCAR Craftsman Truck Series | MB Motorsports | 2 | 0 | 0 | 0 | 304 | 58th |
| 2006 | ARCA Re/Max Series | Allgaier Motorsports | 21 | 1 | 6 | 8 | 4160 | 10th |
| 2006 | NASCAR Craftsman Truck Series | MB Motorsports | 3 | 0 | 0 | 0 | 252 | 56th |
| 2007 | ARCA Re/Max Series | Allgaier Motorsports | 23 | 1 | 4 | 11 | 4855 | 4th |
| 2008 | ARCA Re/Max Series | Allgaier Motorsports | 21 | 6 | 14 | 16 | 5260 | **1st** |
| 2008 | NASCAR Craftsman Truck Series | MB Motorsports | 1 | 0 | 0 | 0 | 91 | 88th |
| 2008 | NASCAR Nationwide Series | Penske Championship Racing | 3 | 0 | 0 | 0 | 370 | 72nd |
| 2009 | NASCAR Nationwide Series | Penske Championship Racing | 35 | 0 | 3 | 12 | 4049 | 6th |
| 2010 | NASCAR Nationwide Series | Penske Championship Racing | 35 | 1 | 8 | 19 | 4679 | 4th |
| 2011 | NASCAR Nationwide Series | Turner Motorsports | 34 | 1 | 6 | 17 | 1105 | **3rd** |
| 2012 | NASCAR Nationwide Series | Turner Motorsports | 33 | 1 | 6 | 19 | 1076 | 6th |
| 2013 | NASCAR Nationwide Series | Turner Scott Motorsports | 33 | 0 | 6 | 16 | 1090 | 5th |
| 2013 | NASCAR Sprint Cup Series | Phoenix Racing | 4 | 0 | 0 | 0 | 0 | NC† |
| 2014 | NASCAR K&N Pro Series West | Menno Admiraal | 1 | 0 | 0 | 0 | 30 | 68th |
| 2014 | NASCAR Sprint Cup Series | HScott Motorsports | 35 | 0 | 0 | 0 | 636 | 29th |
| 2015 | NASCAR Sprint Cup Series | HScott Motorsports | 36 | 0 | 0 | 1 | 588 | 30th |
| 2016 | NASCAR Xfinity Series | JR Motorsports | 33 | 0 | 13 | 27 | 4035 | **3rd** |
| 2016 | NASCAR Sprint Cup Series | HScott Motorsports | 1 | 0 | 0 | 0 | 0 | NC† |
| 2017 | NASCAR Xfinity Series | JR Motorsports | 33 | 2 | 10 | 17 | 4025 | **3rd** |
| 2018 | NASCAR Xfinity Series | JR Motorsports | 33 | 5 | 17 | 24 | 2251 | 7th |
| 2019 | NASCAR Xfinity Series | JR Motorsports | 33 | 1 | 16 | 24 | 4023 | 4th |
| 2020 | NASCAR Xfinity Series | JR Motorsports | 33 | 3 | 11 | 19 | 4032 | **2nd** |
| 2020 | NASCAR Cup Series | Hendrick Motorsports | 1 | 0 | 0 | 0 | 0 | NC† |
| 2021 | ARCA Menards Series | Roy Kovski Racing | 1 | 0 | 1 | 1 | 40 | 73rd |
| 2021 | NASCAR Xfinity Series | JR Motorsports | 33 | 2 | 16 | 24 | 2300 | 5th |
| 2021 | NASCAR Cup Series | Spire Motorsports | 2 | 0 | 0 | 0 | 0 | NC† |
| 2022 | NASCAR Xfinity Series | JR Motorsports | 33 | 3 | 16 | 23 | 4034 | **3rd** |
| 2022 | NASCAR Cup Series | Spire Motorsports | 1 | 0 | 0 | 0 | 0 | NC† |
| 2022 | NASCAR Cup Series | Beard Motorsports | 1 | 0 | 0 | 0 | 0 | NC† |
| 2023 | NASCAR Xfinity Series | JR Motorsports | 33 | 4 | 15 | 20 | 4034 | **2nd** |
| 2024 | NASCAR Xfinity Series | JR Motorsports | 33 | 2 | 10 | 20 | 4035 | **1st** |
| 2024 | NASCAR Cup Series | Hendrick Motorsports | 1 | 0 | 0 | 0 | 0 | NC† |
| 2025 | NASCAR Xfinity Series | JR Motorsports | 33 | 3 | 15 | 20 | 4032 | **3rd** |
| 2025 | NASCAR Cup Series | JR Motorsports | 1 | 0 | 0 | 1 | 0 | NC† |
| 2026 | NASCAR O'Reilly Auto Parts Series | JR Motorsports | 33 | 6 | 20 | 24 | 2477 | **1st** |
| 2026 | NASCAR Cup Series | JR Motorsports | 1 | 0 | 0 | 0 | 0 | NC† |
| 2026 | NASCAR Cup Series | Hendrick Motorsports | 3 | 0 | 0 | 0 | 0 | NC† |

=== NASCAR ===
(key) (Bold – Pole position awarded by qualifying time. Italics – Pole position earned by points standings or practice time. * – Most laps led.)

==== Cup Series ====
NASCAR Cup Series results
| Year | Team | No. | Make | 1 | 2 | 3 | 4 | 5 | 6 | 7 | 8 | 9 | 10 | 11 | 12 | 13 | 14 | 15 | 16 | 17 | 18 | 19 | 20 | 21 | 22 | 23 | 24 | 25 | 26 | 27 | 28 | 29 | 30 | 31 | 32 | 33 | 34 | 35 | 36 | NCSC | Pts | Ref |
|---|---|---|---|---|---|---|---|---|---|---|---|---|---|---|---|---|---|---|---|---|---|---|---|---|---|---|---|---|---|---|---|---|---|---|---|---|---|---|---|---|---|---|
| 2013 | Phoenix Racing | 51 | Chevy | DAY | PHO | LVS | BRI | CAL | MAR | TEX | KAN | RCH | TAL | DAR | CLT | DOV | POC | MCH | SON | KEN | DAY | NHA | IND | POC | GLN | MCH | BRI | ATL | RCH | CHI; 27 | NHA | DOV | KAN; 39 | CLT | TAL; 24 | MAR | TEX | PHO; 31 | HOM | 62nd | 0^{1} | |
| 2014 | HScott Motorsports | 51 | Chevy | DAY; 27 | PHO; 30 | LVS; 31 | BRI; 17 | CAL; 28 | MAR; 23 | TEX; 24 | DAR; 23 | RCH; 21 | TAL; 27 | KAN; 36 | CLT; 37 | DOV; 26 | POC; 27 | MCH; 16 | SON; 33 | KEN; 24 | DAY; 25 | NHA; 37 | IND; 27 | POC; 16 | GLN; 17 | MCH; 42 | BRI; 19 | ATL; 26 | RCH; 28 | CHI; 27 | NHA; 20 | DOV; 29 | KAN; 41 | CLT; 15 | TAL; DNQ | MAR; 17 | TEX; 20 | PHO; 37 | HOM; 15 | 29th | 636 | |
| 2015 | HScott Motorsports | 51 | Chevy | DAY; 37 | ATL; 20 | LVS; 31 | PHO; 18 | CAL; 12 | MAR; 42 | TEX; 39 | BRI; 8 | RCH; 18 | TAL; 23 | KAN; 30 | CLT; 43 | DOV; 42 | POC; 20 | MCH; 27 | SON; 35 | DAY; 18 | KEN; 24 | NHA; 40 | IND; 37 | POC; 24 | GLN; 19 | MCH; 29 | BRI; 12 | DAR; 33 | RCH; 25 | CHI; 23 | NHA; 39 | DOV; 27 | CLT; 40 | KAN; 26 | TAL; 42 | MAR; 13 | TEX; 28 | PHO; 17 | HOM; 36 | 30th | 588 | |
| 2016 | HScott Motorsports | 46 | Chevy | DAY | ATL | LVS | PHO | CAL | MAR | TEX | BRI | RCH | TAL | KAN | DOV | CLT | POC | MCH | SON | DAY | KEN | NHA | IND | POC | GLN | BRI; 40 | MCH | DAR | RCH | CHI | NHA | DOV | CLT | KAN | TAL | MAR | TEX | PHO | HOM | 61st | 0^{1} | |
| 2020 | Hendrick Motorsports | 48 | Chevy | DAY | LVS | CAL | PHO | DAR | DAR | CLT | CLT | BRI | ATL | MAR | HOM | TAL | POC | POC | IND; 37 | KEN | TEX | KAN | NHA | MCH | MCH | DRC | DOV | DOV | DAY | DAR | RCH | BRI | LVS | TAL | ROV | KAN | TEX | MAR | PHO | 53rd | 0^{1} | |
| 2021 | Spire Motorsports | 77 | Chevy | DAY | DRC | HOM | LVS | PHO | ATL | BRD | MAR | RCH | TAL | KAN | DAR | DOV | COA | CLT | SON | NSH | POC | POC; 25 | ROA | ATL | NHA | GLN | IRC | MCH | DAY | DAR | RCH | BRI | LVS | TAL; 40 | ROV | TEX | KAN | MAR | PHO | 59th | 0^{1} | |
| 2022 | Spire Motorsports | 77 | Chevy | DAY | CAL | LVS | PHO | ATL | COA | RCH | MAR | BRD; 36 | TAL | DOV | DAR | KAN | CLT | GTW | SON | NSH | ROA | ATL | NHA | POC | IRC | MCH | RCH | GLN | DAY | DAR | KAN | BRI | TEX | | | | | | | 57th | 0^{1} | |
| 2022 | Beard Motorsports | 62 | Chevy | | | | | | | | | | | | | | | | | | | | | | | | | | | | | | | TAL; 30 | ROV | LVS | HOM | MAR | PHO | 57th | 0^{1} | |
| 2024 | Hendrick Motorsports | 5 | Chevy | DAY | ATL | LVS | PHO | BRI | COA | RCH | MAR | TEX | TAL | DOV | KAN | DAR | CLT; 13 | GTW | SON | IOW | NHA | NSH | CSC | POC | IND | RCH | MCH | DAY | DAR | ATL | GLN | BRI | KAN | TAL | ROV | LVS | HOM | MAR | PHO | 49th | 0^{1} | |
| 2025 | JR Motorsports | 40 | Chevy | DAY; 9 | ATL | COA | PHO | LVS | HOM | MAR | DAR | BRI | TAL | TEX | KAN | CLT | NSH | MCH | MXC | POC | ATL | CSC | SON | DOV | IND | IOW | GLN | RCH | DAY | DAR | GTW | BRI | NHA | KAN | ROV | LVS | TAL | MAR | PHO | 45th | 0^{1} | |
| 2026 | JR Motorsports | 40 | Chevy | DAY; 38 | ATL | COA | PHO | | | | | | | | | | | | | | | | | | | | | | | | | | | | | | | | | 48th | 0^{1} | |
| 2026 | Hendrick Motorsports | 48 | Chevy | | | | | LVS; 25 | DAR; 24 | MAR; 22 | BRI | KAN | TAL | TEX | GLN | CLT | NSH | MCH | POC | COR | SON | CHI | ATL | NWS | IND | IOW | RCH | NHA | DAY | DAR | GTW | BRI | KAN | LVS | CLT | PHO | TAL | MAR | HOM | 48th | 0^{1} | |

===== Daytona 500 =====
| Year | Team | Manufacturer | Start | Finish |
|---|---|---|---|---|
| 2014 | HScott Motorsports | Chevrolet | 40 | 27 |
| 2015 | HScott Motorsports | Chevrolet | 18 | 37 |
| 2025 | JR Motorsports | Chevrolet | 19 | 9 |
| 2026 | JR Motorsports | Chevrolet | 40 | 38 |

==== O'Reilly Auto Parts Series ====
NASCAR O'Reilly Auto Parts Series results
| Year | Team | No. | Make | 1 | 2 | 3 | 4 | 5 | 6 | 7 | 8 | 9 | 10 | 11 | 12 | 13 | 14 | 15 | 16 | 17 | 18 | 19 | 20 | 21 | 22 | 23 | 24 | 25 | 26 | 27 | 28 | 29 | 30 | 31 | 32 | 33 | 34 | 35 | NOAPSC | Pts | Ref |
|---|---|---|---|---|---|---|---|---|---|---|---|---|---|---|---|---|---|---|---|---|---|---|---|---|---|---|---|---|---|---|---|---|---|---|---|---|---|---|---|---|---|
| 2008 | Penske Championship Racing | 12 | Dodge | DAY | CAL | LVS | ATL | BRI | NSH | TEX | PHO | MXC | TAL | RCH | DAR | CLT | DOV | NSH | KEN | MLW | NHA | DAY | CHI | GTW | IRP | CGV | GLN | MCH | BRI | CAL | RCH | DOV | BRI | CLT; 34 | MEM | TEX; 21 | PHO; 11 | HOM; 28 | 72nd | 370 | |
| 2009 | Penske Championship Racing | 12 | Dodge | DAY; 40 | CAL; 14 | LVS; 8 | BRI; 5 | TEX; 10 | NSH; 29 | PHO; 8 | TAL; 32 | RCH; 38 | DAR; 5 | CLT; 14 | DOV; 10 | NSH; 13 | KEN; 5 | MLW; 17 | NHA; 13 | DAY; 8 | CHI; 10 | GTW; 11 | IRP; 21 | IOW; 15 | GLN; 17 | MCH; 7 | BRI; 27 | CGV; 36 | ATL; 17 | RCH; 8 | DOV; 25 | KAN; 6 | CAL; 16 | CLT; 12 | **MEM**; 19 | TEX; 25 | PHO; 16 | HOM; 20 | 6th | 4049 | |
| 2010 | Penske Championship Racing | 12 | Dodge | DAY; 4 | CAL; 9 | LVS; 7 | BRI; 1 | NSH; 4 | PHO; 13 | TEX; 11 | TAL; 15 | RCH; 15 | DAR; 17 | DOV; 16 | CLT; 4 | **NSH**; 4 | KEN; 8 | ROA; 35 | NHA; 6 | DAY; 17 | CHI; 10 | GTW; 25 | IRP; 7 | IOW; 8 | GLN; 34 | MCH; 4 | BRI; 33 | CGV; 9 | ATL; 13 | RCH; 12 | DOV; 9 | KAN; 7 | CAL; 8 | CLT; 3 | **GTW**; 3* | TEX; 13 | PHO; 8 | HOM; 11 | 4th | 4679 | |
| 2011 | Turner Motorsports | 31 | Chevy | DAY; 27 | PHO; 8 | LVS; 2 | BRI; 15 | CAL; 12 | TEX; 6 | TAL; 7 | NSH; 11 | RCH; 3 | DAR; 4 | DOV; 29 | IOW; 8 | CLT; 13 | CHI; 1 | MCH; 13 | ROA; 19 | DAY; 5 | KEN; 19 | NHA; 10 | NSH; 4 | IRP; 27 | IOW; 29 | GLN; 12 | CGV; 8 | BRI; 15 | ATL; 6 | RCH; 9 | CHI; 14 | DOV; 10 | KAN; 11 | CLT; 7 | TEX; 14 | PHO; 9 | HOM; 13 | | 3rd | 1105 | |
| 2012 | Turner Motorsports | 31 | Chevy | DAY; 33 | PHO; 15 | LVS; 8 | BRI; 7 | CAL; 32 | TEX; 7 | RCH; 15 | TAL; 8 | DAR; 13 | IOW; 6 | CLT; 8 | DOV; 5 | MCH; 14 | ROA; 10 | KEN; 5 | DAY; 7 | NHA; 8 | CHI; 3 | IND; 12 | IOW; 2* | GLN; 9 | CGV; 1 | BRI; 30 | ATL; 5 | RCH; 13 | CHI; 11 | KEN; 8 | DOV; 30 | CLT; 34 | KAN; 7 | TEX; 8 | PHO; 11 | HOM; 11 | | | 6th | 1076 | |
| 2013 | Turner Scott Motorsports | 31 | Chevy | DAY; 7 | PHO; 3 | LVS; 15 | **BRI**; 8 | CAL; 11 | TEX; 10 | RCH; 31 | TAL; 5 | DAR; 10 | CLT; 7 | DOV; 12 | IOW; 8 | MCH; 13 | ROA; 2 | KEN; 13 | DAY; 13 | NHA; 13 | CHI; 8 | IND; 33 | IOW; 17 | GLN; 7 | MOH; 8 | BRI; 4 | ATL; 11 | RCH; 11 | CHI; 12 | KEN; 17 | DOV; 12 | KAN; 5 | CLT; 6 | TEX; 19 | PHO; 2 | HOM; 19 | | | 5th | 1090 | |
| 2016 | JR Motorsports | 7 | Chevy | DAY; 12 | ATL; 8 | LVS; 9 | PHO; 4 | CAL; 10 | TEX; 6 | BRI; 5 | RCH; 35 | TAL; 2 | DOV; 4 | CLT; 5 | POC; 39 | MCH; 8 | IOW; 7 | DAY; 2 | KEN; 31 | NHA; 7 | IND; 5 | IOW; 7 | GLN; 7 | MOH; 5 | BRI; 2 | ROA; 6 | DAR; 11 | RCH; 5 | CHI; 5 | KEN; 9 | DOV; 3 | CLT; 6 | KAN; 14 | TEX; 10 | PHO; 4 | HOM; 6 | | | 3rd | 4035 | |
| 2017 | JR Motorsports | 7 | Chevy | DAY; 30 | ATL; 30 | LVS; 4 | PHO; 1* | CAL; 9 | TEX; 13 | BRI; 14 | RCH; 2* | TAL; 8* | **CLT**; 12 | DOV; 11 | POC; 2 | MCH; 16 | IOW; 9 | DAY; 30 | KEN; 8 | NHA; 32 | IND; 35 | IOW; 20 | GLN; 4 | MOH; 31 | BRI; 5 | ROA; 11 | DAR; 8 | RCH; 8 | CHI; 1 | KEN; 3 | DOV; 2 | CLT; 33 | KAN; 5 | TEX; 11 | PHO; 10 | HOM; 12 | | | 3rd | 4025 | |
| 2018 | JR Motorsports | 7 | Chevy | DAY; 31 | ATL; 6 | LVS; 4 | **PHO**; 2* | CAL; 2 | TEX; 35 | BRI; 2 | RCH; 14 | TAL; 3 | DOV; 1* | CLT; 32 | POC; 37 | MCH; 9 | IOW; 1* | CHI; 7 | DAY; 9 | KEN; 4 | NHA; 7 | IOW; 2 | GLN; 3 | MOH; 1 | BRI; 3 | ROA; 1* | DAR; 7 | IND; 1* | LVS; 2 | RCH; 32 | ROV; 15 | DOV; 3 | KAN; 38 | TEX; 5 | PHO; 24 | HOM; 7 | | | 7th | 2251 | |
| 2019 | JR Motorsports | 7 | Chevy | DAY; 2 | ATL; 3 | LVS; 31 | PHO; 14 | CAL; 9 | TEX; 12 | BRI; 30* | RCH; 3 | TAL; 28 | DOV; 2 | CLT; 2 | POC; 11 | MCH; 5 | IOW; 3 | CHI; 32 | DAY; 17 | KEN; 7 | NHA; 3 | IOW; 6 | GLN; 3 | MOH; 6 | BRI; 8 | ROA; 9 | DAR; 9 | IND; 2 | LVS; 5 | RCH; 4 | ROV; 4 | DOV; 2 | KAN; 5 | TEX; 6 | PHO; 1 | HOM; 14 | | | 4th | 4023 | |
| 2020 | JR Motorsports | 7 | Chevy | DAY; 30 | LVS; 8 | CAL; 12 | PHO; 13 | DAR; 3 | CLT; 5 | BRI; 18* | ATL; 6 | HOM; 32 | HOM; 22 | TAL; 28 | POC; 6 | IRC; 7 | KEN; 20 | KEN; 5 | TEX; 3* | KAN; 10 | ROA; 30 | DRC; 9 | DOV; 1* | DOV; 7 | DAY; 29 | DAR; 31 | RCH; 1* | RCH; 1* | BRI; 5* | LVS; 4 | TAL; 29 | ROV; 23 | KAN; 10 | TEX; 26 | MAR; 2 | PHO; 5* | | | 2nd | 4032 | |
| 2021 | JR Motorsports | 7 | Chevy | DAY; 28 | DRC; 26 | HOM; 38 | LVS; 14 | PHO; 8 | ATL; 1 | MAR; 9 | TAL; 29 | DAR; 1 | DOV; 3* | COA; 3 | CLT; 11 | MOH; 35 | TEX; 2 | NSH; 2 | POC; 3 | ROA; 12 | ATL; 7 | NHA; 2 | GLN; 4 | IRC; 11 | MCH; 6 | DAY; 3 | DAR; 6 | RCH; 4 | BRI; 4* | LVS; 2* | TAL; 3 | ROV; 9 | TEX; 4 | KAN; 9 | MAR; 5 | PHO; 9 | | | 5th | 2300 | |
| 2022 | JR Motorsports | 7 | Chevy | DAY; 5 | CAL; 8 | LVS; 5* | PHO; 10 | ATL; 34 | COA; 33 | RCH; 14 | MAR; 29 | TAL; 22 | DOV; 2* | DAR; 1* | TEX; 4 | CLT; 7 | PIR; 5 | NSH; 1* | ROA; 12 | ATL; 7 | NHA; 1 | **POC**; 7 | IRC; 3 | MCH; 2 | GLN; 38 | DAY; 13 | DAR; 4 | KAN; 2 | BRI; 9* | TEX; 29 | TAL; 15 | ROV; 5 | LVS; 3 | HOM; 10 | MAR; 5 | PHO; 3 | | | 3rd | 4034 | |
| 2023 | JR Motorsports | 7 | Chevy | DAY; 3 | CAL; 3 | LVS; 2 | PHO; 36 | ATL; 29 | COA; 5 | RCH; 13 | MAR; 6 | TAL; 28 | DOV; 3 | DAR; 2 | **CLT**; 1* | PIR; 2 | SON; 7 | NSH; 15 | CSC; 3 | ATL; 17 | NHA; 6 | POC; 23 | ROA; 18* | MCH; 14 | IRC; 5 | GLN; 16 | DAY; 1 | DAR; 7 | **KAN**; 18 | BRI; 1* | **TEX**; 5* | ROV; 37 | LVS; 6 | HOM; 15 | MAR; 1 | PHO; 3 | | | 2nd | 4034 | |
| 2024 | JR Motorsports | 7 | Chevy | DAY; 8 | ATL; 28 | LVS; 10 | PHO; 29 | COA; 13 | RCH; 11 | MAR; 5 | TEX; 3* | TAL; 38 | DOV; 17 | DAR; 1* | CLT; 33 | PIR; 2* | SON; 6 | IOW; 30 | NHA; 4 | NSH; 8 | CSC; 9 | POC; 2* | IND; 9 | MCH; 1* | DAY; 7 | DAR; 10 | ATL; 30 | GLN; 17 | BRI; 30 | KAN; 36 | TAL; 25 | ROV; 7 | LVS; 3 | HOM; 8 | MAR; 5 | PHO; 2 | | | 1st | 4035 | |
| 2025 | JR Motorsports | 7 | Chevy | DAY; 18 | ATL; 2 | COA; 29 | PHO; 5* | LVS; 1* | HOM; 1 | MAR; 3 | DAR; 3* | BRI; 3 | CAR; 21 | TAL; 4 | TEX; 35* | CLT; 4* | NSH; 1* | MXC; 34 | POC; 10 | ATL; 31 | CSC; 23 | SON; 6 | DOV; 4 | IND; 36* | IOW; 16 | GLN; 6 | DAY; 3 | PIR; 15 | GTW; 28 | **BRI**; 6 | KAN; 13* | ROV; 8 | **LVS**; 3 | TAL; 3 | MAR; 26 | PHO; 5* | | | 3rd | 4032 | |
| 2026 | JR Motorsports | 7 | Chevy | DAY; 2 | ATL; 33 | COA; 8 | PHO; 1 | LVS; 4* | DAR; 1 | MAR; 1* | CAR; 3 | BRI; 4 | KAN; 3 | TAL; 23 | **TEX**; 2 | GLN; 10 | DOV; 2* | CLT; 29* | NSH; 1* | POC; 1* | COR; 32 | SON; 26 | CHI; 6 | ATL; 1 | IND; 2 | IOW; 24* | DAY; 6 | DAR; 17* | GTW; 13 | BRI; 4 | LVS; 34 | CLT; 4 | PHO; 3 | TAL; 4 | MAR; 2 | HOM; 7 | | | 1st | 2477 | |

==== Craftsman Truck Series ====
NASCAR Craftsman Truck Series results
| Year | Team | No. | Make | 1 | 2 | 3 | 4 | 5 | 6 | 7 | 8 | 9 | 10 | 11 | 12 | 13 | 14 | 15 | 16 | 17 | 18 | 19 | 20 | 21 | 22 | 23 | 24 | 25 | NCTC | Pts | Ref |
|---|---|---|---|---|---|---|---|---|---|---|---|---|---|---|---|---|---|---|---|---|---|---|---|---|---|---|---|---|---|---|---|
| 2005 | MB Motorsports | 63 | Ford | DAY | CAL | ATL | MAR; DNQ | GTW; DNQ | MFD | CLT | DOV | TEX | MCH | MLW; 26 | KAN; 36 | KEN; DNQ | MEM; DNQ | IRP | NSH | BRI | RCH | NHA | LVS; 27 | MAR | ATL | TEX; 27 | PHO | HOM; DNQ | 58th | 304 | |
| 2006 | MB Motorsports | 63 | Ford | DAY | CAL | ATL | MAR | GTW | CLT | MFD | DOV | TEX | MCH | MLW; 22 | KAN; 21 | KEN; 36 | MEM | IRP | NSH | BRI | NHA | LVS | TAL | MAR | ATL | TEX | PHO | HOM | 56th | 252 | |
| 2008 | MB Motorsports | 63 | Ford | DAY | CAL | ATL | MAR | KAN | CLT | MFD | DOV | TEX | MCH | MLW | MEM | KEN; 24 | IRP | NSH | BRI | GTW | NHA | LVS | TAL | MAR | ATL | TEX | PHO | HOM | 88th | 91 | |

^{*} Season still in progress
^{1} Ineligible for series points

=== ARCA Menards Series ===
(key) (Bold – Pole position awarded by qualifying time. Italics – Pole position earned by points standings or practice time. * – Most laps led.)

ARCA Menards Series results
| Year | Team | No. | Make | 1 | 2 | 3 | 4 | 5 | 6 | 7 | 8 | 9 | 10 | 11 | 12 | 13 | 14 | 15 | 16 | 17 | 18 | 19 | 20 | 21 | 22 | 23 | AMSC | Pts | Ref |
|---|---|---|---|---|---|---|---|---|---|---|---|---|---|---|---|---|---|---|---|---|---|---|---|---|---|---|---|---|---|
| 2002 | Allgaier Motorsports | 99 | Chevy | DAY | ATL | NSH | SLM | KEN | CLT | KAN | POC | MCH | TOL | SBO | KEN | BLN | POC | NSH | ISF; 17 | WIN | | | | | | | 62nd | 465 | |
| 2002 | Allgaier Motorsports | 4 | Chevy | | | | | | | | | | | | | | | | | | DSF; 11 | CHI | | | | | 62nd | 465 | |
| 2002 | Allgaier Motorsports | 75 | Chevy | | | | | | | | | | | | | | | | | | | | SLM; 17 | TAL | CLT | | 62nd | 465 | |
| 2003 | Allgaier Motorsports | 86 | Chevy | DAY | ATL | NSH | SLM; 12 | TOL; 6 | KEN | CLT | BLN | KAN | MCH | LER | POC | POC | NSH | | | | | SLM; 3 | TAL | CLT | SBO | | 27th | 915 | |
| 2003 | Allgaier Motorsports | 86 | Pontiac | | | | | | | | | | | | | | | ISF; 28 | WIN; 15 | DSF; 30 | CHI | | | | | | 27th | 915 | |
| 2004 | Allgaier Motorsports | 86 | Pontiac | DAY | NSH | SLM | KEN | TOL; 29 | CLT | KAN | POC | MCH | SBO | BLN | KEN | GTW; 27 | POC | LER | NSH | ISF; 10 | TOL; 2 | DSF; 4 | CHI | SLM | TAL | | 35th | 835 | |
| 2005 | Allgaier Motorsports | 86 | Pontiac | DAY | NSH | SLM; 34 | KEN | TOL; DNQ | LAN | | | | | | | | | | | | | | | | | | 31st | 1380 | |
| 2005 | Allgaier Motorsports | 2 | Pontiac | | | | | | | MIL; 6 | POC | MCH | KAN; 13 | KEN; 5 | BLN | POC | GTW; 29 | LER | NSH | MCH | | | | | | | 31st | 1380 | |
| 2005 | Allgaier Motorsports | 7 | Pontiac | | | | | | | | | | | | | | | | | | **ISF**; 2 | TOL; 4 | DSF; 4* | CHI | SLM | TAL | 31st | 1380 | |
| 2006 | Allgaier Motorsports | 02 | Ford | DAY; DNQ | | | | | | | | | | | | | | | | | | | | | | | 10th | 4160 | |
| 2006 | Allgaier Motorsports | 16 | Chevy | | NSH; DNQ | SLM; 18 | | KEN; 4 | | POC; 15 | MCH; 40 | KAN; 38 | KEN; 39 | BLN; 9 | POC; 19 | GTW; 36 | NSH; 16 | MCH; 40 | | MIL; 4* | TOL; 4 | DSF; 32 | CHI; 29 | SLM; 3 | TAL; 26 | IOW; 25 | 10th | 4160 | |
| 2006 | Allgaier Motorsports | 16 | Pontiac | | | | WIN; 7 | | TOL; 2 | | | | | | | | | | ISF; 1 | | | | | | | | 10th | 4160 | |
| 2007 | Allgaier Motorsports | 16 | Chevy | DAY; 7 | USA; 4 | NSH; 11 | SLM; 10 | KAN; 8 | WIN; 29 | KEN; 10 | TOL; 14 | IOW; 7 | POC; 8 | MCH; 31 | BLN; 5 | KEN; 40 | POC; 6 | NSH; 30 | ISF; 11 | MIL; 23 | GTW; 4 | DSF; 22 | CHI; 27 | SLM; 1 | TAL; 13 | TOL; 26 | 4th | 4855 | |
| 2008 | Allgaier Motorsports | 16 | Chevy | DAY; 2 | SLM; 1 | IOW; 2 | KAN; 30 | CAR; 27 | KEN; 21 | TOL; 4 | POC; 5 | MCH; 37 | CAY; 1 | KEN; 3 | **BLN**; 2 | POC; 1 | NSH; 8 | ISF; 6 | DSF; 16 | CHI; 4 | SLM; 4 | NJE; 1 | | TOL; 1 | | | 1st | 5260 | |
| 2008 | Allgaier Motorsports | 16 | Dodge | | | | | | | | | | | | | | | | | | | | TAL; 1 | | | | 1st | 5260 | |
| 2021 | Roy Kovski Racing | 16 | Chevy | DAY | PHO | TAL | KAN | TOL | CLT | MOH | POC | ELK | BLN | IOW | WIN | GLN | MCH | ISF; 4 | MLW | DSF | BRI | SLM | KAN | | | | 73rd | 40 | |

==== K&N Pro Series West ====
NASCAR K&N Pro Series West results
| Year | Team | No. | Make | 1 | 2 | 3 | 4 | 5 | 6 | 7 | 8 | 9 | 10 | 11 | 12 | 13 | 14 | Pos. | Pts | Ref |
|---|---|---|---|---|---|---|---|---|---|---|---|---|---|---|---|---|---|---|---|---|
| 2014 | Menno Admiraal | 83 | Chevy | PHO | IRW | S99 | IOW | KCR | SON; 14 | SLS | CNS | IOW | EVG | KCR | MMP | AAS | PHO | 68th | 30 | |

Sporting positions
| Preceded by Frank Kimmel | ARCA Re/MAX Series champion 2008 | Succeeded by Justin Lofton |
| Preceded by Cole Custer | NASCAR O'Reilly Auto Parts Series Champion; 2024; 2026 | Succeeded by Jesse Love; Incumbent |
Achievements
| Preceded by Landon Cassill | NASCAR Nationwide Series Rookie of the Year; 2009 | Succeeded by Ricky Stenhouse Jr. |
