= By-wire =

By-wire refers to technologies in which a system is controlled using electrical or electronic means rather than by a mechanical linkage that transfers force from the input to the system. The concept is used in aviation and in the automotive industry. By analogy, it may refer to managing by wire, a management style relying on an informational representations of the business, similar to fly-by-wire pilots who rely on an informational representation of the plane.

By-wire concepts and systems include:

- Drive by wire in automotive contexts
  - Accelerate-by-wire or throttle-by-wire, more commonly known as electronic throttle control
  - Brake-by-wire
  - Shift-by-wire in automatic transmissions that are manumatic or in automated manual transmissions. This may include park by wire which actuates the parking pawl as part of the shifting system.
  - Steer-by-wire
- Fly-by-wire in aviation contexts
  - Power-by-wire, a system which actuates the aircraft's flight controls with electrical actuators in place of hydraulic actuators.
