= Penske Truck Leasing =

American company

Penske Truck Leasing Co., L.P.
- Type: Joint Venture
- Industry: Rentals
- Founded: December 1, 1969; 56 years ago
- Headquarters: Reading, Pennsylvania, U.S.
- Key people: Roger Penske (Founder & Chairman); Brian Hard (President & CEO)
- Products: Truck rentals and leasing, fleet maintenance, logistics, used truck sales
- Revenue: US$8.4 billion
- Number of employees: 40,000
- Parent: Penske Corporation (70%); Mitsui & Co (30%)
- Website: www.gopenske.com

Penske Truck Leasing Co., L.P. is a joint venture of Penske Corporation, Penske Automotive Group, and Mitsui & Co. Headquartered in Reading, Pennsylvania, the company was founded by Team Penske owner Roger Penske on December 1, 1969. It is Penske’s flagship and best known division. The firm serves customers in North America, South America, Europe, Asia, and Australia; among its services are full-service commercial truck leasing, truck fleet maintenance, truck rentals, and used truck sales. The company currently employs more than 40,000 workers worldwide and operates and maintains a fleet of more than 450,000 vehicles. Brian Hard is the president and CEO of the company.

Of note, Penske Truck Leasing has been investing in and expanding its fleet of commercial electric trucks and adding electric truck charging stations infrastructure to its locations.

In September 2017, General Electric sold the last of its stake in Penske for $674 million. The 15.5% stake was purchased by Penske and a subsidiary of Mitsui.

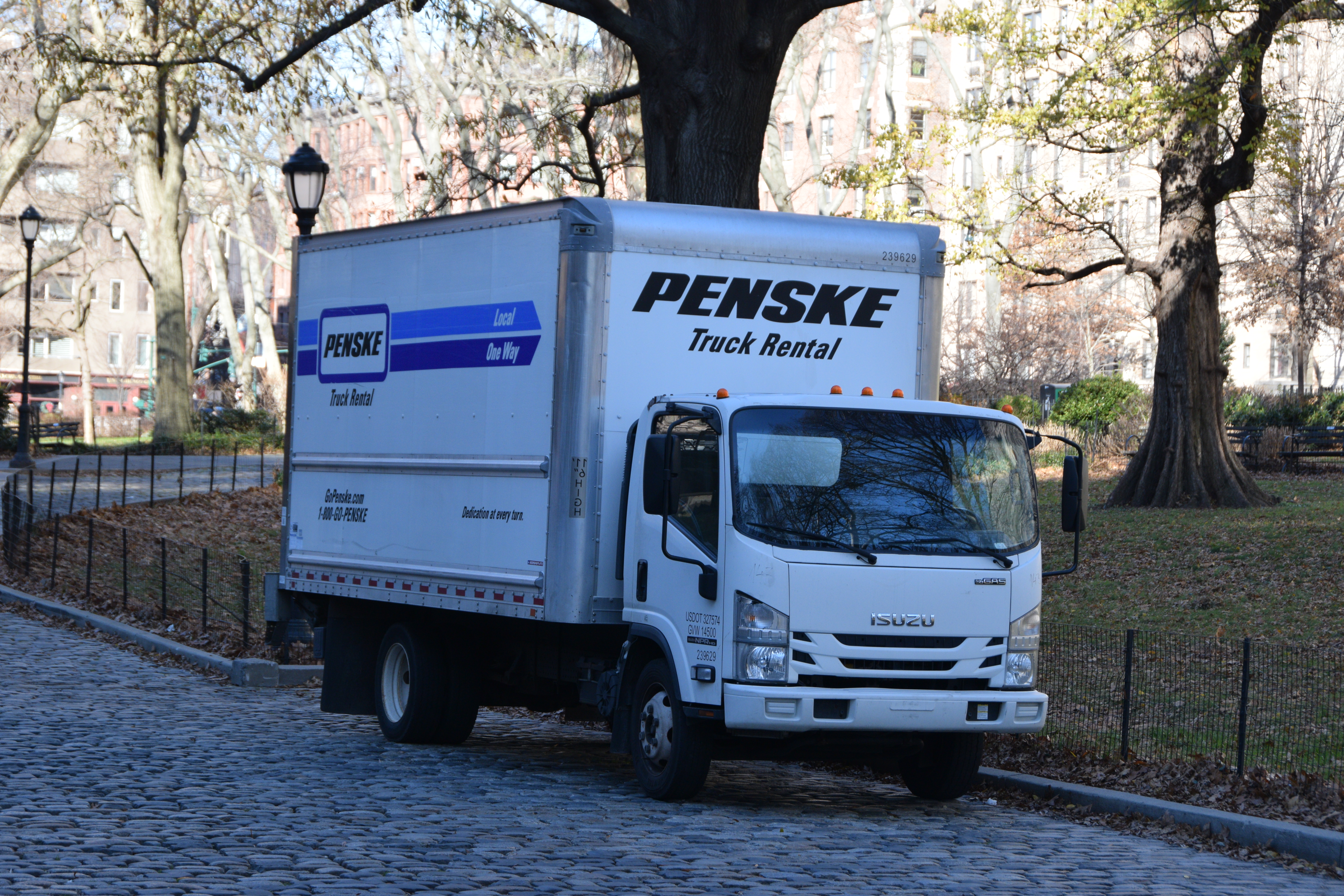
Penske Truck Leasing Isuzu Elf in New York

== Subsidiaries and units ==
=== Penske Truck Rental ===
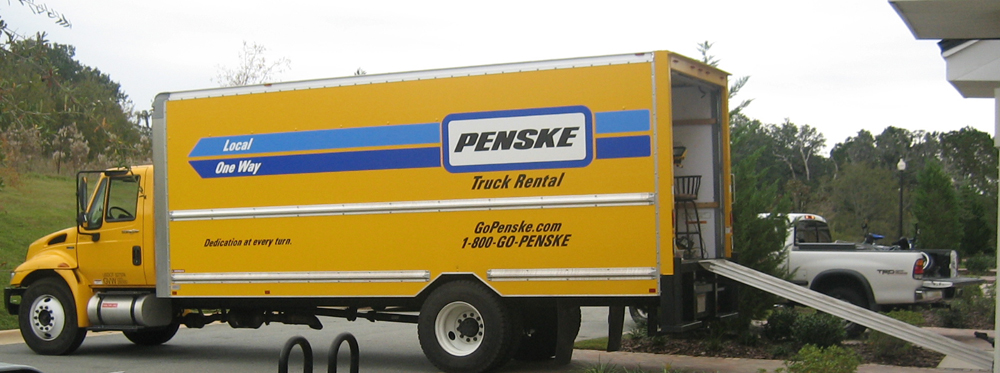
Penske truck with loading ramp down

Penske Truck Rental is an operating unit of Penske Truck Leasing with a rental fleet of more than 85,000 trucks and more than 2,500 consumer truck rental locations in the U.S., Canada, and Australia. It rents commercial semi-trucks, straight trucks, and semi-trailers to businesses that haul freight; it also rents trucks to consumers for do-it-yourself local or one-way long-distance moves.

=== Penske Logistics ===
Penske Logistics-branded day cab refrigerated trailer Freightliner

Penske Logistics operated more than 360 locations in North America, South America, Europe, and Asia as of 2017. In 2024, the subsidiary had revenues of $4.3 billion and was ranked #12 among the top 20 for-hire trucking companies by industry publication Transport Topics. The unit operates more than 20,000 trailers and 7,000 tractors.

The unit's customers have included Wawa, Whirlpool Corporation, and the Ford Motor Company.

Penske Logistics acquired Transfreight North America from Mitsui in 2015 and Greensboro, North Carolina-based EPES Transport Systems in 2018.

In 2025, Penske Logistics partnered with Snowflake Inc. to incorporate AI analysis of trucks' telematics data into fleet management practices. Penske Logistics deployed Augment, an AI platform for tracking shipments, in January 2026, following a six-month pilot. At launch, the system was managing 600,000 live loads, automating previously manual processes for freight visibility and fleet dispatch.

Penske Vehicle Services, a related business unit, provides specialty services like custom painting for special edition cars.

=== Penske Used Trucks ===
Penske Used Trucks is an operating unit of Penske Truck Leasing that sells off-lease trucks, semi-trucks, trailers, and other trucking-related equipment directly to businesses and to the used truck wholesale marketplace.

In 2024, Penske Used Trucks launched Penske Auctions, which hosts weekly auctions for a variety of vehicles and trailers from Penske's rental and leasing businesses.

== Sponsorship ==
In the 2009 IndyCar Series, Will Power drove four races for Team Penske with Penske Truck Leasing sponsorship. Teammate Hélio Castroneves had Penske Truck Leasing sponsorship for three races in 2011 and seven races in 2012. Simon Pagenaud carried Penske Truck Leasing sponsorship for eight races in the 2015 IndyCar Series.

== See also ==
- Penske Corporation
- Joint venture
