= V-model =

Graphic of a systems development lifecycle

The V-model of the systems engineering process.

The V-model is a graphical representation of a systems development lifecycle. It is used to produce rigorous development lifecycle models and project management models. The V-model falls into three broad categories, the German V-Modell, a general testing model, and the US government standard.

The V-model summarizes the main steps to be taken in conjunction with the corresponding deliverables within computerized system validation framework, or project life cycle development. It describes the activities to be performed and the results that have to be produced during product development.

The left side of the "V" represents the decomposition of requirements, and the creation of system specifications. The right side of the "V" represents an integration of parts and their validation. However, requirements need to be validated first against the higher level requirements or user needs. Furthermore, there is also something as validation of system models. This can partially be done on the left side also. To claim that validation only occurs on the right side may not be correct. The easiest way is to say that verification is always against the requirements (technical terms) and validation is always against the real world or the user's needs. The aerospace standard RTCA DO-178B states that requirements are validated—confirmed to be true—and the end product is verified to ensure it satisfies those requirements.

Validation can be expressed with the query "Are you building the right thing?" and verification with "Are you building it right?"

== Types ==
There are three general types of V-model.

=== V-Modell ===
"V-Modell" is the official project management method of the German government. It is roughly equivalent to PRINCE2, but more directly relevant to software development. The key attribute of using a "V" representation was to require proof that the products from the left-side of the V were acceptable by the appropriate test and integration organization implementing the right-side of the V.

=== General testing ===
Throughout the testing community worldwide, the V-model is widely seen as a vaguer illustrative depiction of the software development process as described in the International Software Testing Qualifications Board Foundation Syllabus for software testers. There is no single definition of this model, which is more directly covered in the alternative article on the V-Model (software development).

=== US government standard ===
The US also has a government standard V-model. Its scope is a narrower systems development lifecycle model, but far more detailed and more rigorous than most UK practitioners and testers would understand by the V-model.

== Validation vs. verification ==
It is sometimes said that validation can be expressed by the query "Are you building the right thing?" and verification by "Are you building it right?" In practice, the usage of these terms varies.

The PMBOK guide, also adopted by the IEEE as a standard (jointly maintained by INCOSE, the Systems engineering Research Council SERC, and IEEE Computer Society) defines them as follows in its 4th edition:

- "Validation. The assurance that a product, service, or system meets the needs of the customer and other identified stakeholders. It often involves acceptance and suitability with external customers. Contrast with verification."
- "Verification. The evaluation of whether or not a product, service, or system complies with a regulation, requirement, specification, or imposed condition. It is often an internal process. Contrast with validation."

== Objectives ==
The V-model provides guidance for the planning and realization of projects. The following objectives are intended to be achieved by a project execution:

- Minimization of project risks: The V-model improves project transparency and project control by specifying standardized approaches and describing the corresponding results and responsible roles. It permits an early recognition of planning deviations and risks and improves process management, thus reducing the project risk.
- Improvement and guarantee of quality: As a standardized process model, the V-model ensures that the results to be provided are complete and have the desired quality. Defined interim results can be checked at an early stage. Uniform product contents will improve readability, understandability and verifiability.
- Reduction of total cost over the entire project and system life cycle: The effort for the development, production, operation and maintenance of a system can be calculated, estimated and controlled in a transparent manner by applying a standardized process model. The results obtained are uniform and easily retraced. This reduces the acquirer's dependency on the supplier and the effort for subsequent activities and projects.
- Improvement of communication between all stakeholders: The standardized and uniform description of all relevant elements and terms is the basis for the mutual understanding between all stakeholders. Thus, the frictional loss between user, acquirer, supplier and developer is reduced.

== V-model topics ==
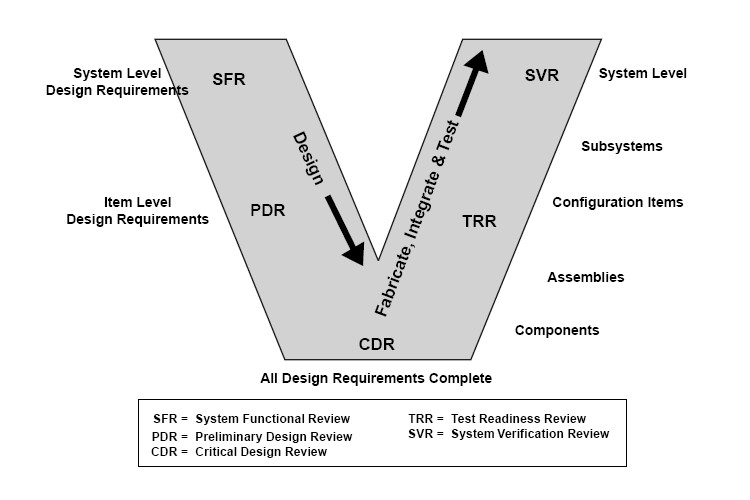
Systems engineering and verification.

=== Systems engineering and verification ===
The systems engineering process (SEP) provides a path for improving the cost-effectiveness of complex systems as experienced by the system owner over the entire life of the system, from conception to retirement.

It involves early and comprehensive identification of goals, a concept of operations that describes user needs and the operating environment, thorough and testable system requirements, detailed design, implementation, rigorous acceptance testing of the implemented system to ensure it meets the stated requirements (system verification), measuring its effectiveness in addressing goals (system validation), on-going operation and maintenance, system upgrades over time, and eventual retirement.

The process emphasizes requirements-driven design and testing. All design elements and acceptance tests must be traceable to one or more system requirements and every requirement must be addressed by at least one design element and acceptance test. Such rigor ensures nothing is done unnecessarily and everything that is necessary is accomplished.

=== The two streams ===
==== Specification stream ====
The specification stream mainly consists of:

- User requirement specifications
- Functional requirement specifications
- Design specifications

==== Testing stream ====
The testing stream generally consists of:

- Installation qualification (IQ)
- Operational qualification (OQ)
- Performance qualification (PQ)

The development stream can consist (depending on the system type and the development scope) of customization, configuration or coding.

== Applications ==
Off-Core alternatives (illustrating upward and downward iterations and Time and Maturity dimension). Source - K. Forsberg and H. Mooz 2004

The V-model is used to regulate the software development process within the German federal administration. Nowadays it is still the standard for German federal administration and defense projects, as well as software developers within the region.

The concept of the V-model was developed simultaneously, but independently, in Germany and in the United States in the late 1980s:

- The German V-model was originally developed by IABG in Ottobrunn, near Munich, in cooperation with the Federal Office for Defense Technology and Procurement in Koblenz, for the Federal Ministry of Defense. It was taken over by the Federal Ministry of the Interior for the civilian public authorities domain in summer 1992.
- The US V-model, as documented in the 1991 proceedings for the National Council on Systems Engineering (NCOSE; now INCOSE as of 1995), was developed for satellite systems involving hardware, software, and human interaction.
- The V-model first appeared at Hughes Aircraft circa 1982 as part of the pre-proposal effort for the FAA Advanced Automation System (AAS) program. It eventually formed the test strategy for the Hughes AAS Design Competition Phase (DCP) proposal. It was created to show the test and integration approach which was driven by new challenges to surface latent defects in the software. The need for this new level of latent defect detection was driven by the goal to start automating the thinking and planning processes of the air traffic controller as envisioned by the automated enroute air traffic control (AERA) program. The reason the V is so powerful comes from the Hughes culture of coupling all text and analysis to multi dimensional images. It was the foundation of Sequential Thematic Organization of Publications (STOP) created by Hughes in 1963 and used until Hughes was divested by the Howard Hughes Medical Institute in 1985.
- The US Department of Defense puts the systems engineering process interactions into a V-model relationship.

It has now found widespread application in commercial as well as defense programs. Its primary use is in project management and throughout the project lifecycle.

One fundamental characteristic of the US V-model is that time and maturity move from left to right and one cannot move back in time. All iteration is along a vertical line to higher or lower levels in the system hierarchy, as shown in the figure. This has proven to be an important aspect of the model. The expansion of the model to a dual-Vee concept is treated in reference.

As the V-model is publicly available many companies also use it. In project management it is a method comparable to PRINCE2 and describes methods for project management as well as methods for system development. The V-model, while rigid in process, can be very flexible in application, especially as it pertains to the scope outside of the realm of the System Development Lifecycle normal parameters.

== Advantages ==
These are the advantages V-model offers in front of other systems development models:

- The users of the V-model participate in the development and maintenance of the V-model. A change control board publicly maintains the V-model. The change control board meets anywhere from every day to weekly and processes all change requests received during system development and test.
- The V-model provides concrete assistance on how to implement an activity and its work steps, defining explicitly the events needed to complete a work step: each activity schema contains instructions, recommendations and detailed explanations of the activity.

== Limitations ==
The following aspects are not covered by the V-model, they must be regulated in addition, or the V-model must be adapted accordingly:

- The placing of contracts for services is not regulated.
- The organization and execution of operation, maintenance, repair and disposal of the system are not covered by the V-model. However, planning and preparation of a concept for these tasks are regulated in the V-model.
- The V-model addresses software development within a project rather than a whole organization.

== See also ==
- Engineering information management (EIM)
- ARCADIA (as supporting systems modeling method)
- IBM Rational Unified Process (as a supporting software process)
- Waterfall model of software development
- Systems architecture
- Systems design
- Model-based systems engineering
- Theory U
