= Index of software engineering articles =

This is an alphabetical list of articles pertaining specifically to software engineering.

== 0–9 ==
2D computer graphics — 3D computer graphics

== A ==
Abstract syntax tree — Abstraction — Accounting software — Ada — Addressing mode — Agile software development — Algorithm — Anti-pattern — Application framework — Application software — Artificial intelligence — Artificial neural network — ASCII — Aspect-oriented programming — Assembler — Assembly language — Assertion — Automata theory — Automotive software — Avionics software

== B ==
Backward compatibility — BASIC — BCPL — Berkeley Software Distribution — Beta test — Boolean logic — Business software

== C ==
C — C++ — C# — CAD — Canonical model — Capability Maturity Model — Capability Maturity Model Integration — COBOL — Code coverage — Cohesion — Compilers — Complexity — Computation — Computational complexity theory — Computer — Computer-aided design — Computer-aided manufacturing — Computer architecture — Computer bug — Computer file — Computer graphics — Computer model — Computer multitasking — Computer programming — Computer science — Computer software — Computer term etymologies — Concurrent programming — Configuration management — Coupling — Cyclomatic complexity

== D ==
Data structure — Data-structured language — Database — Dead code — Decision table — Declarative programming — Design pattern — Development stage — Device driver — Disassembler — Disk image — Domain-specific language

== E ==
EEPROM — Electronic design automation — Embedded system — Engineering — Engineering model — EPROM — Even-odd rule — Expert system — Extreme programming

== F ==
FIFO (computing and electronics) — File system — Filename extension — Finite-state machine — Firmware — Formal methods — Forth — Fortran — Forward compatibility — Functional decomposition — Functional design — Functional programming

== G ==
Game development — Game programming — Game tester — GIMP Toolkit — Graphical user interface

== H ==
Hierarchical database — High-level language — Hoare logic — Human–computer interaction — Hyperlink — Hyper-threading

== I ==
IEEE Software — Imperative programming — Information technology engineering — Information systems — Information technology — Instruction set — Interactive programming — Interface description language — Intermediate language — Interpreter — Invariant — ISO — ISO 9000 — ISO 9001 — ISO 9660 — ISO/IEC 12207 — ISO image — Iterative development

== J ==
Java — Java Modeling Language — Java virtual machine

== K ==
Kernel — Knowledge management

== L ==
Level design — Level designer — LIFO — Linux — List of programming languages — Literate programming

== M ==
Machine code — Machine language — Mainframe — Medical informatics — Medical software — Mesh networking — Metadata (computing) — Microcode — Microprogram — Microsoft Windows — Minicomputer — MIPS architecture — Multi-paradigm programming language

== N ==
Neural network software — Numerical analysis

== O ==
Object code — Object database — Object-oriented programming — Ontology — Opcode — Open implementation — Open-source software — Operating system

== P ==
Packet writing — Pair programming — Parallax scrolling — Pascal — p-code machine — Perl — PHP — Post-object programming — Privacy Engineering - Procedural programming — Processor register — Program specification — Programming language — Programming paradigm — Programming tool — Project lifecycle — Proprietary software — Python

== Q ==
Qt (toolkit) — Query optimizer — Queueing theory

== R ==
Rapid application development — Rational Unified Process — Real-time operating system — Refactoring — Reflection — Regression testing — Relational database — Release to manufacturing — Reliability engineering — Requirement — Requirements analysis — Revision control — Robotics

== S ==
Scripting language — Second-system effect — Signal analysis — Simulation — Software — Software architecture — Software bloat — Software brittleness — Software componentry — Software configuration management — Software development cycle — Software development process — Software engineering — Software framework — Software maintenance — Software metric — Source code — Source lines of code — Specification language — Sprite — SQL — Standard data model — SCAMPI — Stack (abstract data type) — Static code analysis — Static single-assignment form — Statistical package — String — Structured programming — Structured Query Language — Subroutine — Supercomputer — Systems architect — Systems development life cycle — Systems design — SPICE (ISO15504)

== T ==
Tcl — Texture mapping — Theory of computation — Think aloud protocol — Thread — Threaded code — Three-address code — Timeboxing — TinyOS

== U ==
UCSD Pascal — Unix — Usability — Usability testing — User interface

== V ==
Video games — Virtual finite-state machine — Visual Basic (classic) — Visual Basic .NET

== W ==
Waterfall model — Wiki — Windows — Windows Vista

== X ==
Xerox PARC —

== Y ==
YouTube —

== Z ==
Z notation —
