= Gilb =

Gilb is a surname. Notable people with the surname include:

- Dagoberto Gilb (born 1950), American writer
- Mike Gilb (fl. 2000s), American politician
- Tom Gilb (born 1940), American engineer, consultant, and author

== See also ==
- Gilb., taxonomic author abbreviation of Robert Lee Gilbertson (1925–2011), American mycologist
