= Concurrent Design Facility =

European Space Agency assessment center f

The Concurrent Design Facility (CDF) is the European Space Agency main assessment center for future space missions and industrial review. Located at ESTEC, ESA's technical center in Noordwijk in The Netherlands, it has been operational since early 2000.

As suggested by its name, the CDF uses concurrent engineering methodology to perform effective, fast and cheap space mission studies. Equipped with a state-of-the-art network of computers, multimedia devices and software tools, the CDF allows teams of experts to perform design studies during working sessions.

== Activities ==
The CDF is mainly in charge of performing the assessment studies of future missions for the European Space Agency. These assessment studies are performed in the early phases of mission and spacecraft design; the so-called "Phase 0" or "Pre-phase A" of the ESA Project Phases in which needs are identified and Mission Analysis is performed.

Phase 0 focusses the following:

- Identification and characterisation of the intended mission.
- Expression in terms of needs, expected performance and dependability and safety goals.space
- Assessment of operating constraints, in particular as regards the physical and operational environment.
- Identification of possible system concepts, with emphasis on the degree of innovation and any critical aspect.
- Preliminary assessment of project management data (organisation, costs, schedules).

=== Current main activities ===
In addition to the "normal" studies, the CDF is currently being used as the assessment center for the ESA Cosmic Vision program.

=== List of assessment studies ===
A list of assessment studies accomplished by the CDF is:

Year	Title	Customer	Online Report
2016	ALASCC - Assessment of Airborne Launch of Spacecraft Constellation	LAU/GSP	
	SHAME - Assessment of Space Hardware Advanced Manufacturing Engineering	TEC/GSP	
	MSR Carrier - Mars Sample Return Carrier Mission	HRE/GSP	
	EHEV - Assessment of European Human Exploration Vehicle	HRE	
	COUPLED - SysNova Concept Study of CubeSat Opportunity Payload Internetworking Sensors (COPINS)	GSP	
	AIM PRR - Combined Industrial Preliminary Requirements Review	GSP	
	AIM iSRR - Combined Industrial Intermediate System Requirements Review	GSP	
2015	SpectroCube - NanoSat Astrobiology/Chemistry mission for HEO	GSP	http://emits.sso.esa.int/emits-doc/ESTEC/AO6445-Nanosat-v3.pdf
	Global-V - Instrument study for future Chinese Space Mission	BELSPO	
	CTH-B - Cis Lunar Transfer Habitat Bus	HSO/GSP	
	SMILE - Assessment of Payload Module for Joint ESA/CAS Mission	SRE/GSP	
	XIPE - Assessment of X-ray Telescope Mission as part of Cosmic Vision M-Class Selection	SRE/GSP	
	HAPI - SysNova Winner - Atmospheric Measurement of Nitrogen Dioxide using Nanosatellite Constellation	GSP	
	ORORO - SysNova Winner - Radio Occultation and Reflectometry with Nanosatellite Constellation	GSP	
	ARIEL - Assessment of Infrared Exoplanet Large Survey Mission as part of Cosmic Vision M-Class Selection	SRE/GSP	
	THOR - Mission to Explore Plasma Energisation in Space Turbulence as part of Cosmic Vision M-Class Selection	SRE/GSP	
	PRIDE - Assessment of Innovative Space Vehicles	LAU	
	HERACLES - Human/Robotic Lunar Partnership Mission (HRLPM2)	HSO/GSP	
	d.Deorbit - Joint ESA/DLR Assessment of In-Orbit Demonstrator	TEC/GSP	
	CLEP - Assessment of a Europa Moon Penetrator	SRE/GSP	http://sci.esa.int/future-missions-department/56440-assessment-of-a-europa-penetrator-mission-clep-cdf-study/#
	CLEO - Assessment of a Jovian Moon Flyby Mission	SRE/GSP	http://sci.esa.int/science-e/www/object/doc.cfm?fobjectid=56432
	Vega 3S - Launch Configuration for Small Satellites with Vega Launcher	LAU/GSP	
2014	MEX14 OCDT Demonstration and Development Study	GSP	
	HRLPM - Human Robotic Lunar Partnership Mission	HSO-KS/GSP	
	SAOCOM PRR - Preliminary Requirements Review	EOP	
	SULTAN - System of Systems Study ISR Capability Study	GSP	
	HEMS1 - Explorations Scenarios	HSO/GSP	
	e.Deorbit PRR - Preliminary Requirements Review	GSP	
	NGCryoTel - Assessment Study for Next Generation Cryogenic IR Telescope	SRE-PF/GSP	http://sci.esa.int/future-missions-office/56046-cdf-study-report-next-generation-cryogenic-infra-red-telescope-ng-cryoirtel/#
	ATHENA - X-Ray Telescope Assessment Study	SRE-PF/GSP	https://www.cosmos.esa.int/documents/400752/400864/ATHENA+-+CDF+Study+Report.pdf
	AIM3P - Asteroid Impact Mission Payload Investigation	GSP	
	MarsFAST - Assessment of Rapid Rover for Mars	SRE-PF/GSP	http://sci.esa.int/future-missions-department/56167-cdf-study-report-marsfast-rover/#
	MAPPER RDV - Assessment of Rendezvous Alternative for MAPPER	HSO-IL/GSP	
	AIM3 - Asteroid Investigation Mission to Characterise Binary Asteroid Didymos	GSP	
	PHOBOS SR - Assessment of Sample Return Mission to Phobos	SRE-PF/GSP	http://sci.esa.int/science-e/www/object/doc.cfm?fobjectid=55322
	EC2ETS - European Contribution to Two Exploration Transportation Systems	HSO	
	AVUM ADR - Assessment of Active Debris Removal Using AVUM Upper Stage	GSP	
	MAPPER - Assessment of Lunar Polar Sample Return Mission	HSO-IL/GSP	
2013	SAOCOM CS Companion SAR in Formation with Argentinian SAR	EOP/GSP	
	FMRD - Flown Mission ReDesign - CDF Calibration Study	TEC/GSP	
	D4D - Design for Demise ( MiCRA for Clean Space)	CSI/GSP	
	METOP - Assessment Study for METOP SG Deorbit Options	EOP/GSP	
	CoBRA - Contactless Earth-Bound Modification using Chemical Propulsion - Winner of ESA SySNova Competition	GSP	
	SPADES - Solid Propellant Autonomous Deorbit System	CSI/GSP	
2012	CHEOPS - Characterising Exoplanet Satellite (Cosmic Vision small class mission)	SRE/GSP	
	e.Deorbit - Assessment of feasibility [sic] for controlled deorbit of Envisat	Clean Space/GSP	
	e.SAT - Electric Propulsion for Telecomm Satellites	TIA	
	AGILE 2 - Extended Advanced Galileo Injection Using Electric Propulsion	NAV-EF	
	MMSR A5 - Moons of Mars Sample Return Using Ariane 5	SRE-PA/GSP	
	KuaFu - Space Weather, 2 small satellites	SRE-FP/GSP	
	OPS SAT - In-Orbit Demonstrator CubeSat	HSO-OPS/GSP	
	Envisat DA - Envisat Deorbit Analysis	DG/GSP	
	AIM - Asteroid Impact Mission	PPG-PF/GSP	
	ILS - Interplanetary Life Support MiCRA	DG-PF/GSP	
	ADI - Asteroid Deflection by Ions Siroco MiCRA	DG-PF/GSP	
	DDI - Ion Beam Shepherd MiCRA	DG-PF/GSP	
	Exploration Scenarios Final Roadmap Review	HSF-EA/GSP	
2011	IXV EVO - Assessment of Intermediate eXperimental Vehicle Evolution	LAU-SNX	
	MMSR - Moons of Mars Sample Return	SRE-PA/GSP	
	MNSM - Mars Network Science Mission	SRE-PA/GSP	
	Marco Polo R - Sample Return from NEA	SRE-PA/GSP	
	ICPA Phase 2 - ISR Capability Pack Assessment Study	ESA/EDA/GSP	
	LOFT - Large Observatory for X-Ray Timing	SRE-PA/GSP	
	VAC - Post ATV Derivative Concept	D/HSO/DG/GSP	
	AGILE - Alternative Trajectories for Galileo	NAV-EF	
	EU LISA - Europe only version of LISA mission	LISA Project/GSP	
	ECHO - ExoPlanet Observatory	SRE-PA/GSP	
	COMPSAR - Passive Companion for Sentinel 1	EOP-SF/GSP	
	STE QUEST - Space Time Explorer and Quantum Equivalence Test	SRE-PA/GSP	
	Exploration Scenarios Comparative Review	HSF-EA/GSP	
	ICPA Phase 1 - ISR Capability Pack Assessment Study	ESA/EDA/GSP	
	NEMS - Crewed Mission to Near Earth Asteroid	GSP	
	Envisat DO - Deorbit Mission	EOP-PEL/GSP	
	PHOEBUS - High Speed Reentry Demonstrator	TEC-MPA/GSP	
2010	COMPLEX - Technology, Exploration, Demonstration	DG-P/GSP	
	MREP ASR - Mars Atmosphere Sample Return	DSRE/GSP	
	STE - Space Time Explorer	DSRE/GSP	
	RAiDS - Radiation Assessment in Deep Space	DG-P/GSP	
	PEP - Venus Planetary Entry Probes	DSRE/GSP	
	PEP - Saturn Planetary Entry Probes	DSRE/GSP	
	PEP - Uranus Planetary Entry Probes	DSRE/GSP	
	PEP - Neptune Planetary Entry Probes	DSRE/GSP	
	NGL SYS - Next Generation Launcher System	DLAU	
	R2D3 - Rendezvous and Refuelling Demonstrator	DG-P/GSP	
	LUMETTO - Lunar Mapping and Exploration Technology	DG-P/GSP	
	NGL IA - Next Generation Launcher Innovative Avionics	DLAU	
	PLATO DE - Design Evolution	DSRE/GSP	
	Exoplanets	DSRE/GSP	
	Alpha A - Building Block European Launcher	DLAU	
	GIANUS II (SoS)	DG-P/GSP	
	ADS-B - Automatic Dependent Surveillance Broadcast	DTIA	
2009	Nanosat	DTEC/GSP	
	IXO Telescope	DSRE/GSP	
	MarsGEN	DSRE/GSP	
	ECOSAT	ESA GSP	
	MarsREX	DSRE/GSP	
	MiniMEX	DTEC/GSP	
	MarsLEV	DSRE/GSP	
	De-Orbit	DTEC/GSP	
	Automated Identification System (AIS)	ESA Telecomms	
	MoonSAV	ESA Human Space Flight/GSP	
	MoonNext DSR	ESA Human Space Flight/GSP	
	Meteron	ESA OPS	
2008	Mars Electric Propulsion(MEP)	DTEC/GSP	
	Marco Polo - Near Earth Object	ESA Science/GSP	[Polo v4-1-esa-cdf.pdf]
	Euclid - Dark Energy Study	ESA Science/GSP	
	AirQualSat - Model (AQS)	DTEC/GSP	
	SPICA/SAFARI Telescope	ESA Science/GSP	
	XEUS - Xray Telescope	ESA Science/GSP	
	LaPlace - Jupiter Moons Study	ESA Science/GSP	
	Tandem - Two Probe Mission to Titan	ESA Science/GSP	
	Space Exploration Architecture	ESA Human Spaceflight	
	Sentinel 5 Precursor	EOP/GSP	
	Slush - Densified Propellant	Launchers	
	Xray Telescope (IXO)	ESA Science/GSP	
	Accurate	EOP/GSP	
2007	Air Traffic Management Demonstration Payload (ATMDP)	Telecom/GSP	
	System-on-Chip (SoC)	DTEC/GSP	
	Near Earth Object Monitoring(SANCHO)	ESA Advanced Concepts Team/GSP	
	Jupiter Radiation Study (JURA)	ESA Science	
	Cosmic Microwave Polarisation Mapper(CMPM)	ESA Science	
	Comsat for Air Traffic Management (IRIS)	TEN-A	
	Lunar Sample Return (LSR)	ESA Human Spaceflight	
	Mars Technology Demonstrator (MARSNeXT)	ESA Human Spaceflight	
	Near Earth Object Review (DQS)	ESA Advanced Concepts Team/GSP	
	Nuclear Thermal Rocket Propulsion (NUM)	LAU-PAD/GSP	
	Vegetation Gap Filler (VGT)	DTEC/GSP	
	Transiting Exoplanet Survey- PLATO (Cosmic Vision)	ESA Science/GSP	
	Earth Plasma Study - Cross Scale (Cosmic Vision)	ESA Science/GSP	
	Space Exploration Architecture (AES)	ESA Human Spaceflight	
2006	RAM Electric Propulsion (RAM EP)	DTEC/GSP	
	In Orbit Demonstrator(IOD)	DTEC/GSP	
	European Student Moon Orbiter(ESMO)	ESA/GSP	
	Small Geostationary Telecommunication Satellite(SGEO)	ESA/TEC Telecommunications	
	Configuration REvisit Targeting Europa (CRETE)	ESA Science	
	Wireless Technology for Spacecraft(WiFLY)	DTEC/GSP	
	Long Term Cryogenic Propulsion (LTCP)	DTEC/GSP	
	Far Infrared Interferometer(FIRI)	ESA Science	http://sci.esa.int/future-missions-office/40738-firi-cdf-study-report/#
	Wide Field Interferometer(WFI)	ESA Science	http://sci.esa.int/future-missions-office/40533-cdf-study-report-for-wfi/#
	Cross-Track Scanner Microwave Radiometer (XMWR)	ESA Earth Observation	
2005	Lunar Robotic Mission (LES 3)	ESA Exploration	
	Jupiter Entry Probe (JEP)	ESA Science	
	Formation Flying (PROBA 3)	DTEC/GSP	
	Space Alternative Energy Storage Systems (SPAESS)	Advanced Concepts Team	
	VEGA 1 Payload	DLAU, DTEC & Education	
	Near Earth Objects (NEO2 )	Advanced Concepts Team/GSP	
	Lunar Cargo Transport System (LES CTS)	ESA Exploration	
	BeagleNet	ESA Exploration	
	Heavy Lift Launch Vehicle (HLLV)	ESA Launchers/GSP	
2004	Near-Earth Objects Precursor Mission (NEO1 )	ESA Advanced Concepts Team/GSP	
	Lunar Exploration Study 1 (LES)	ESA Exploration	
	Atmospheric Space Interactions Monitor (ASIM)	ESA Human Spaceflight	
	Mars DemoLander 2 (MDL)	ESA GSP	
	X-ray Evolving Universe Spectroscopy 2 (XEUS)	ESA Science	
	X-ray Evolving Universe Spectroscopy 1 (XEUS)	ESA Science	http://sci.esa.int/ixo/37601-xeus-cdf-report/#
	Sub mm Wave Instrument (SWI)	ESA GSP/Technical Directorate	
	Europa Low Resource Radar (ELRR)	ESA Science	
	Mars DemoLander 1 (MDL)	ESA GSP	
	VEGA evolution with electric propulsion (E-VEGA)	ESA Technical Directorate/Launchers/GSP	
	ExoMars Phase B preparation - Specifications	ESA Aurora	
	Solar Orbiter 2 - Composite option pre-assessment	ESA Science	
	Human Spaceflight Vision (HSV) - European man-tended Moon base	ESA Human Spaceflight	
	Socrates - Reusable launcher demonstrator	ESA Launchers	
	Human Missions to Mars	ESA Aurora	
2003	International Microgravity Plasma Facility (IMPACT)	ESA Human Spaceflight	
	AeroCapture Demonstrator Earth and Mars	ESA Aurora	
	Mars Sample Return	ESA Aurora	
	Mars Network Science - Probe network on Mars surface	ESA Science	
	Crew Transportation Vehicle (CTV) - Soyuz design enhancement	ESA Human Spaceflight	
	Crew Transportation Vehicle (CTV) - Model and validation	ESA GSP	
	P Band Sounder Instrument design for Antarctica (P-Sounder) - First CDF IDA	ESA Earth Observation	
2002	ISS Droplet Combustion Insert (DCI) - Support to industrial Phase A	ESA Human Spaceflight	
	Rosita - Telescope accommodation outside Columbus module	ESA Human Spaceflight	
	EXOMARS 09 DM - Mars Exobiology Descent Module	ESA Aurora	
	EXOMARS 09 - A second Mars Exobiology mission design	ESA Aurora	
	BepiColombo All-SEPM Delta Study - Reaching Mercury with electric propulsion	ESA Science	
	Mars Exobiology - European mission to search for life on Mars	ESA Aurora	
2001	ISS Dusty Plasma Facility - Support to industrial Phase A	ESA Human Spaceflight	
	EUROPA - Preliminary assessment	ESA GSP	
	Space Weather - Three elements service monitoring the solar-terrestrial environment	ESA GSP/Technical Directorate	
	Ocean Earth Watch - Operational mission for ocean and coastal zone monitoring	ESA Earth Observation	
2000	Hyper Precision Atom Interferometry in Space	ESA Science	
	STORMS - 3x Constellation for Magnetosphere Storms	ESA Science	
	MASTER - Mars and Asteroid Mission	ESA Science	
	Eddington - Stellar Physics and Planet Finder Telescope	ESA Science	
	World Space Observatory (WSO/UV)	ESA Science	
	Mercury Surface Element (MeSE)	ESA Science	
	Meteo Imager Sounder Satellite (MISS)	ESA Earth Observation/Eumetsat	
1999	Solar Orbiter - Study of the Sun and Inner Heliosphere	ESA Science	
	Central European Satellite for Advanced Research (CESAR'99)	Agenzia Spaziale Italiana (ASI)	

=== List of reviews ===
Year	Title	Customer
2006	Don Quijote Mid-Term Review	DTEC/GSP
	Review of Europa Industrial Studies (REIS)	ESA Science
2004	PASTEUR - Industrial Phase A mid term review	ESA Aurora
	Mars Sample Return (MSR) - Industrial Phase A mid term review	ESA Aurora
	Human Mission Russian review	ESA Aurora
	ExoMars - Industrial Phase A mid term review	ESA Aurora
	Entry Vehicle Demonstrator (EVD) review	ESA Aurora
2003	KEO review	ESA GSP
2002	BepiColombo - Review of industrial studies	ESA Science
	Mars Exobiology - Review of the Babakin Study	ESA Aurora
2001	Satellite Test of the Equivalence Principle (STEP) - Review of industrial study	ESA Science
	Laser Interferometer Space Antenna (LISA) - Review of industrial study	ESA Science
	Laser Interferometer Space Antenna - Review of the industrial study	ESA Science

== Facility ==
The CDF design room was designed and equipped with relevant hardware and software tools, with the aim of creating an effective communication and data interchange environment among team members. In 2008, ESA donated its older CDF facility to the International Space University (ISU) in Strasbourg, for educational purposes.

== See also ==
- Advanced Concepts Team
- Concurrent engineering
- ECSS-E-TM-10-25A
- Open Concurrent Design Server
