= Engineering design process =

Factors that influence engineering design process

The engineering design process refers to how engineers create and validate designs for products, processes and systems---including their lifecycle processes such as manufacture, maintenance and end-of-life considerations such as recycling, remanufacture or disposal. A range of descriptions of the process are available; there is no single standard form, although many aspects are recognisable across individual engineers' practices and companies' processes. Regardless of context, the engineering design process is iterative – activities and decisions often need to be revisited several times as new information becomes available – though what gets iterated and how many times may vary.

Some of the ways of describing the engineering design process are as a progression through steps or stages, as a collaborative social activity involving many participants, and as a decision making process in which the engineering sciences, basic sciences and mathematics are applied to make a series of decisions in a systematic way to meet stated objectives. Because the engineering design process is very complex and situation-specific, each individual perspective shows only a piece of the puzzle; modern thinking recommends a pluralistic approach considering multiple perspectives to develop a solid understanding of the engineering design process. Among the fundamental elements of the design process are the establishment of objectives and criteria, synthesis, analysis, construction, testing and evaluation.

The concept of the engineering design process is distinct from the concepts of the engineering method and the engineering mindset. The process refers to how engineering work unfolds or should unfold over time, over a series of stages, or over a set of activities. The related terms of engineeering method and engineering mindset refer to the more general systematic approach that engineers use to address problems. Thus for example, engineering method and mindset can be used to address complex problems in business as well as in engineering itself.

== Common stages and activities ==
The engineering design process is articulated in a wide variety of models. Many split the process into different stages which have different characteristics and constituent activities. Different terminology is commonly employed and the stages are sometimes split differently; so different models may have varying degrees of overlap, although the underlying concepts are similar.

One model of the engineering design process delineates the following stages: research, conceptualization, feasibility assessment, establishing design requirements, preliminary design, detailed design, production planning and tool design, and production. Others, noting that "different authors (in both research literature and in textbooks) define different phases of the design process with varying activities occurring within them," have suggested more simplified/generalized models – such as problem definition, conceptual design, preliminary design, detailed design, and design communication. Another summary of the process, from European engineering design literature, includes clarification of the task, conceptual design, embodiment design, detail design. (NOTE: In these examples, other key aspects – such as concept evaluation and prototyping – are subsets and/or extensions of one or more of the listed steps.)

The next headings summarize some key steps required in most engineering design processes.

=== Research ===
Various stages of the design process (and even earlier) can involve a significant amount of time spent on locating information and research. Consideration should be given to the existing applicable literature, problems and successes associated with existing solutions, costs, and marketplace needs.

The source of information should be relevant. Reverse engineering can be an effective technique if other solutions are available on the market. Other sources of information include the Internet, local libraries, available government documents, personal organizations, trade journals, vendor catalogs and individual experts available.

=== Establishing design requirements ===
Establishing design requirements and conducting requirement analysis, sometimes termed problem definition (or deemed a related activity), is one of the most important elements in the design process in certain industries, and this task is often performed at about the same time as a feasibility analysis. The design requirements guide the design of the product or process being developed, throughout the engineering design process. These include basic things like the functions, attributes, and specifications – determined after assessing user needs. Some design requirements include hardware and software parameters, maintainability, availability, and testability. This activity is important because requirements may affect and constrain all later engineering design activity.

=== Feasibility studies ===
In some cases, a feasibility study is carried out after which schedules, resource plans and estimates for the next phase are developed. The feasibility study is an evaluation and analysis of the potential of a proposed project to support the process of decision making. It outlines and analyses alternatives or methods of achieving the desired outcome. The feasibility study helps to narrow the scope of the project to identify the best scenario. A feasibility report is generated following which Post Feasibility Review is performed.

The purpose of a feasibility assessment is to determine whether the engineer's project can proceed into the design phase. This is based on two criteria: the project needs to be based on an achievable idea, and it needs to be within cost constraints. It is important to have engineers with experience and good judgment to be involved in this portion of the feasibility study.

=== Concept generation ===
A concept study (conceptualization, conceptual design) is often a phase of project planning that includes producing ideas and taking into account the pros and cons of implementing those ideas. This stage of a project is done to minimize the likelihood of error, manage costs, assess risks, and evaluate the potential success of the intended project. In any event, once an engineering issue or problem is defined, potential solutions must be identified. ideation refers to the mental process by which ideas are generated. The following are some widely used techniques to help stimulate ideation:

- brainstorming – this popular method involves thinking of different ideas, typically as part of a small group, while resisting initial critique of them, and building on ideas proposed by others.
- morphological analysis – independent design characteristics are listed in a chart, and different engineering solutions are proposed for each solution. Normally, a preliminary sketch and short report accompany the morphological chart.
- synectics – the engineer imagines him or herself as the item and asks, "What would I do if I were the system?" This unconventional method of thinking may find a solution to the problem at hand.
- trigger word – a word or phrase associated with the issue at hand is stated, and subsequent words and phrases are evoked.

These are just a few examples, there are many more ideation methods that may be used. Ideation usually aims to generate a large volume and variety of ideas, which should also be potentially useful. Most recommendations for ideation focus on promoting divergent thinking and discourage concurrent evaluation of idea quality, since this may limit the range of possibilities considered.

Raw ideas must be roughly screened for viability and those that pass the initial screening should be developed into concepts that can be evaluated more comprehensively from an engineering perspective. The developed concepts usually undergo a concept evaluation step, which may utilise various structured methods to analyse the relative strengths and weakness of possible alternatives, before selecting one to take forward to the next design stage. This entire phase relies heavily on experience and expertise, although quantitative engineering methods can also play a role in concept evaluation.

=== Preliminary design ===
The preliminary design, or high-level design includes (also called FEED or Basic design), bridges a gap between design conception and detailed design, particularly in cases where the level of conceptualization achieved during ideation is not sufficient for full evaluation. So in this task, the overall system configuration is defined, and schematics, diagrams, and layouts of the project may provide early project configuration. (This notably varies a lot by field, industry, and product.) During detailed design and optimization, the parameters of the part being created will change, but the preliminary design focuses on creating the general framework to build the project on.

S. Blanchard and J. Fabrycky describe it as: “The ‘whats’ initiating conceptual design produce ‘hows’ from the conceptual design evaluation effort applied to feasible conceptual design concepts. Next, the ‘hows’ are taken into preliminary design through the means of allocated requirements. There they become ‘whats’ and drive preliminary design to address ‘hows’ at this lower level.”

=== Detailed design ===
Following FEED is the Detailed Design (Detailed Engineering) phase, which may consist of procurement of materials as well. This phase further elaborates each aspect of the project/product by complete description through solid modeling, drawings as well as specifications.

Computer-aided design (CAD) programs have made the detailed design phase more efficient. For example, a CAD program can provide optimization to reduce volume without hindering a part's quality. It can also calculate stress and displacement using the finite element method to determine stresses throughout the part.

=== Production planning ===
The production planning and tool design consists of planning how to mass-produce the product and which tools should be used in the manufacturing process. Tasks to complete in this step include selecting materials, selection of the production processes, determination of the sequence of operations, and selection of tools such as jigs, fixtures, metal cutting and metal or plastics forming tools. This task also involves additional prototype testing iterations to ensure the mass-produced version meets qualification testing standards. It is essential to recognise that production issues need to be considered during every stage of engineering design since they affect viability, cost and quality of the realised solution; but they can only be finalised once the design itself is fully completed.

== Degree programs ==
The engineering design process and associated methods are taught in universities worldwide, including (but not limited to) those with ABET or Washington Accord accredited engineering programs.

== See also ==
- Applied science
- Computer-automated design
- Design engineer
- Engineering analysis
- Engineering optimization
- Industrial engineering
- New product development
- Systems engineering process
- Surrogate model
- Traditional engineering
