= Cape St. Vincent (disambiguation) =

Cape St. Vincent is in the Algarve, Portugal.

Cape St. Vincent may also refer to:

- Battle of Cape St. Vincent (disambiguation), one of several battles fought off Cape St. Vincent in Portugal
- SS Cape St. Vincent, a ship launched under this name, later known as SS Empire Arquebus, HMS Cicero, and SS Al Sudan

== See also ==
- Cape Vincent, New York
- CSV (disambiguation)
