= Concurrent engineering =

Product development methodology

Concurrent engineering (CE) or concurrent design and manufacturing is a work methodology emphasizing the parallelization of tasks (i.e. performing tasks concurrently), which is sometimes called simultaneous engineering or integrated product development (IPD) using an integrated product team approach. It refers to an approach used in product development in which functions of design engineering, manufacturing engineering, and other functions are integrated to reduce the time required to bring a new product to market.

By completing the design and manufacturing stages at the same time, products are produced in less time while lowering cost. Although concurrent design and manufacturing requires extensive communication and coordination between disciplines, the benefits can increase the profit of a business and lead to a sustainable environment for product development. Concurrent design and manufacturing can lead to a competitive advantage over other businesses as the product may be produced and marketed in less time. However, poorly implemented concurrent engineering can lead to issues.

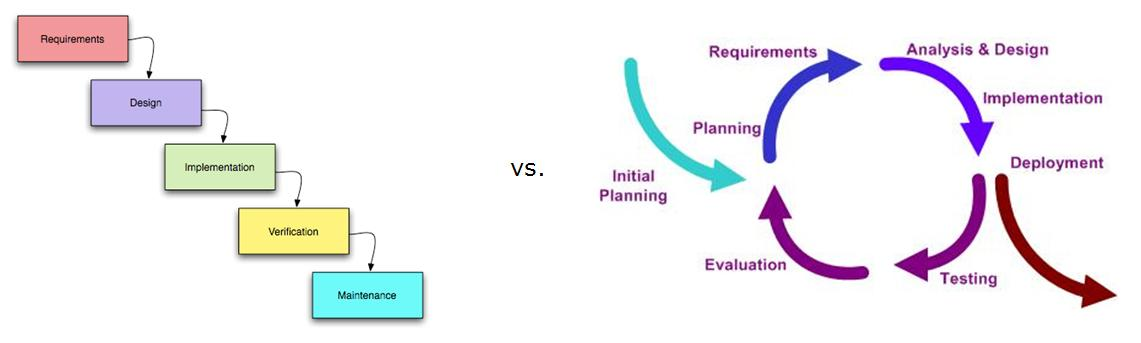
Sequential Engineering vs Concurrent Design and Manufacturing

== Introduction ==
The success behind concurrent design and manufacturing lies within completing processes at the same time while involving all disciplines. As product development has become more cost and time efficient over the years, elements of concurrent engineering have been present in product development approaches. The elements of concurrent engineering that were utilized were cross-functional teams as well as fast time-to-market and considering manufacturing processes when designing. By involving multiple disciplines in decision making and planning, concurrent engineering has made product development more cost and time efficient. The fact that concurrent engineering could result in faster time-to-market is already an important advantage in terms of a competitive edge over other producers. Concurrent engineering has provided a structure and concept for product development that can be implemented for future success.

A 2008 publication described concurrent engineering as a new design management system that has matured in recent years to become a well-defined systems approach to optimizing design and engineering cycles. Concurrent engineering has been implemented in a number of companies, organizations, and universities, most notably in the aerospace industry. Beginning in the early 1990s, CE was also adapted for use in the information and content automation field, providing a basis for organization and management of projects outside the physical product development sector for which it was originally designed. Organizations such as the European Space Agency's Concurrent Design Facility make use of concurrent design to perform feasibility studies for future missions.

The basic premise for concurrent engineering revolves around two concepts. The first is the idea that all elements of a product's life-cycle—from functionality, production, assembly, testing, maintenance, environmental impact, and finally disposal and recycling—should be taken into careful consideration in the early design phases.

The second concept is that design activities should all be occurring at the same time, i.e., concurrently. The idea is that the concurrent nature of these activities significantly increases productivity and product quality. This way, errors and redesigns can be discovered early in the design process when the project is still flexible. By locating and fixing these issues early, the design team can avoid what often become costly errors as the project moves to more complicated computational models and eventually into the actual manufacturing of hardware.

As mentioned above, part of the design process is to ensure that the product's entire life cycle is taken into consideration. This includes establishing user requirements, propagating early conceptual designs, running computational models, creating physical prototypes, and eventually manufacturing the product. Included in this process is taking into full account funding, workforce capability, and time requirements. A 2006 study claimed that a correct implementation of the concurrent design process can save a significant amount of money, and that organizations have been moving to concurrent design for this reason. It is also highly compatible with systems thinking and green engineering.

Concurrent engineering replaces the more traditional sequential design flow, or "Waterfall Model". In Concurrent Engineering an iterative or integrated development method is used instead. The Waterfall method moves in a linear fashion, starting with user requirements and sequentially moving forward to design and implementation, until you have a finished product. In this design system, a design team would not quickly look backward or forward from the step it is on to fix or anticipate problems. In the case that something does go wrong, the design usually must be scrapped or heavily altered. The concurrent or iterative design process encourages prompt changes of tack, so that all aspects of the life cycle of the product are taken into account, allowing for a more evolutionary approach to design. The difference between the two design processes can be seen graphically in Figure 1.

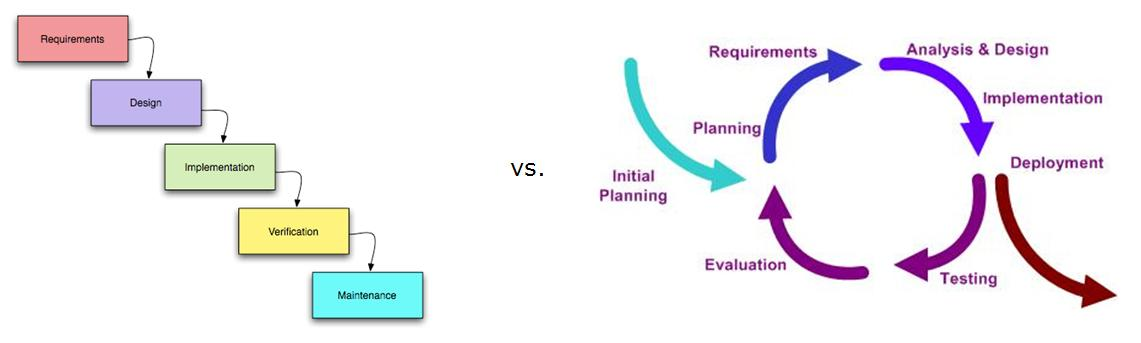
Traditional "Waterfall" or Sequential Development Method vs. Iterative Development Method in concurrent engineering.

A significant part of the concurrent design method is that the individual engineer is given much more say in the overall design process due to the collaborative nature of concurrent engineering. Giving the designer ownership is claimed to improve the productivity of the employee and quality of the product, based on the assumption that people who are given a sense of gratification and ownership over their work tend to work harder and design a more robust product, as opposed to an employee that is assigned a task with little say in the general process.

=== Challenges associated with concurrent design ===
Concurrent design comes with a series of challenges, such as implementation of early design reviews, dependency on efficient communication between engineers and teams, software compatibility, and opening up the design process. This design process usually requires that computer models (computer aided design, finite element analysis) are exchanged efficiently, something that can be difficult in practice. If such issues are not addressed properly, concurrent design may not work effectively. Although the nature of some project activities imposes a degree of linearity—completion of software code, prototype development and testing, for example—organizing and managing project teams to facilitate concurrent design can still yield significant benefits that come from the improved sharing of information.

Service providers exist that specialize in this field, not only training people how to perform concurrent design effectively, but also providing the tools to enhance the communication between the team members.

== Elements ==
=== Cross-functional teams ===
Cross-functional teams include people from different area of the workplace that are all involved in a particular process, including manufacturing, hardware and software design, marketing, and so forth.

=== Concurrent product realization ===
Doing several things at once, such as designing various subsystems simultaneously, is critical to reducing design time and is at the heart of concurrent engineering.

=== Incremental information sharing ===
Incremental information sharing helps minimize the chance that concurrent product realization will lead to surprises. "Incremental" meaning that as soon as new information becomes available, it is shared and integrated into the design. Cross-functional teams are important to the effective sharing of information in a timely fashion.

=== Integrated project management ===
Integrated project management ensures that someone is responsible for the entire project, and that responsibility is not handed-off once one aspect of the work is done.

== Definition ==
Several definitions of concurrent engineering are in use.

The first one is used by the Concurrent Design Facility (ESA):

Concurrent Engineering (CE) is a systematic approach to integrated product development that emphasizes the response to customer expectations. It embodies team values of co-operation, trust and sharing in such a manner that decision making is by consensus, involving all perspectives in parallel, from the beginning of the product life cycle.

The second one is by Winner, et al., 1988:

Concurrent Engineering is a systematic approach to the integrated, concurrent design of products and their related processes, including, manufacturing and support. This approach is intended to cause the developers from the very outset to consider all elements of the product life cycle, from conception to disposal, including quality, cost, schedule, and user requirements.

== Concurrent vs sequential engineering ==
Concurrent and Sequential engineering cover the same stages of design and manufacturing, however, the two approaches vary widely in terms of productivity, cost, development and efficiency. The 'Sequential Engineering vs Concurrent Design and Manufacturing' figure shows sequential engineering on the left and concurrent design and manufacturing on the right. As seen in the figure, sequential engineering begins with customer requirements and then progresses to design, implementation, verification and maintenance. The approach for sequential engineering results in large amounts of time devoted to product development. Due to large amounts of time allocated towards all stages of product development, sequential engineering is associated with high cost and is less efficient as products can not be made quickly. Concurrent engineering, on the other hand, allows for all stages of product development to occur essentially at the same time. As seen in the 'Sequential Engineering vs Concurrent Design and Manufacturing' figure, initial planning is the only requirement before the process can occur including planning design, implementation, testing and evaluation. The concurrent design and manufacturing approach allows for shortening of product development time, higher efficiency in developing and producing parts earlier and lower production costs.

Concurrent and Sequential Engineering may also be compared using a relay race analogy. Sequential engineering is compared to the standard approach of running a relay race, where each runner must run a set distance and then pass the baton to the next runner and so on until the race is completed. Concurrent engineering is compared to running a relay race where two runners will run at the same time during certain points of the race. In the analogy, each runner will cover the same set distance as the sequential approach but the time to complete the race using the concurrent approach is significantly less. When thinking of the various runners in the relay race as stages in product development, the correlation between the two approaches in the relay race to the same approaches in engineering is vastly similar. Although there are more complex and numerous processes involved in product development, the concept that the analogy provides is enough to understand the benefits that come with concurrent design and manufacturing.

== Business benefits ==
Using concurrent engineering, businesses can cut down on the time it takes to go from idea to product. The time savings come from designing with all the steps of the process in mind, eliminating any potential changes that have to be made to a design after a part has gone all the way to production before realizing that it is difficult or impossible to machine. Reducing or eliminating these extra steps means the product will be completed sooner and with less wasted material in the process. During the design and prototyping process, potential issues in the design can be corrected earlier in the product development stages to further reduce the production time frame.

The benefits of concurrent design and manufacturing can be sorted in to short term and long term.

=== Short term benefits ===
- Competitive advantage with implementing part into market quickly
- Large amounts of same part produced in a shorter amount of time
- Allows for early correction of part
- Less material wasted
- Less time spent on multiple iterations of essentially the same part

=== Long term benefits ===
- More cost efficient over several parts produced and several years
- Large amounts of different parts produced in a shorter total amount of time
- Better communication between disciplines in company
- Ability to leverage teamwork and make informed decisions

== Using C.E. ==
Currently, several companies, agencies and universities use CE. Among them can be mentioned:

- Concurrent Design Facility - European Space Agency
- NASA Team X - Jet Propulsion Laboratory
- NASA Integrated Design Center (IDC), Mission Design Lab (MDL), and Instrument Design Lab (IDL) - Goddard Space Flight Center
- NASA Compass Team - Glenn Research Center
- CNES – French Space Agency
- ASI – Italian Space Agency
- Boeing
- EADS Astrium – Satellite Design Office
- Thales Alenia Space
- The Aerospace Corporation Concept Design Center
- STV Incorporated
- German Aerospace Center Concurrent Engineering Facility
- EPFL Space Center
- Schlumberger
- Harley Davidson
- ASML
- Fiberthree
- Toyota

== See also ==
- ESA's Concurrent Design Facility
- Iterative design
- New product development
- Open Concurrent Design Server
- Product Life Cycle
- Product lifecycle management
- Traditional engineering
