= CSV =

CSV may refer to:

== Computing ==
- Certified Server Validation, a spam fighting technique
- Cluster Shared Volumes, a Microsoft Windows Server 2008 technology
- Comma-separated values, a file format and extension
- Computerized system validation, a documentation process

== Organizations ==
- CSV Apeldoorn, a Netherlands football club
- Christian Social People's Party, a political party in Luxembourg
- Clerics of Saint Viator, a Roman Catholic institute
- Community Service Volunteers, a British charity
- Confederación Sudamericana de Voleibol (South American Volleyball Confederation)
- Conseil scolaire Viamonde, a public school board in Ontario, Canada

== Transportation ==
- Chevrolet Special Vehicles, Holden racing car
- Corsa Specialised Vehicles, an Australia car-maker
- Crestview station (Florida), Amtrak code CSV, a former train station in the United States
- GM U platform, General Motors cross-over sport vans

== Other ==
- C. S. Venkataraman, a mathematician from Kerala, India
- ČSV, a Sámi initialism
- Character Strengths and Virtues, 2004 book
- Coppa Sergio Valci, association football cup competition in Vatican City
- Creating shared value, a business concept
