= Advanced Concepts Team =

ESA research laboratory

Advanced Concepts Team European Space Agency
- Formation: 1 March 2002
- Headquarters: Noordwijk, the Netherlands
- Founder: Franco Ongaro
- Team Lead: Dario Izzo
- Website: Home Page

Advanced Concepts Team (ACT) is a research lab within the European Space Agency tasked to "... monitor and perform research on advanced space concepts and technologies, preparing ESA for any disruptive change to come.". Located at the European Space Research and Technology Centre, in the Netherlands, the team was instituted in 2002 with the objective of fostering advanced research on space systems, innovative concepts and working methods. It serves the function of a think tank providing decision makers the support of a highly multidisciplinary research group. Science and engineering research fellows (PhDs working at the European Space Agency for 2 years), Young Graduate Trainee and interns form the bulk of the Team. They carry out research work on advanced topics and emerging technologies and perform highly skilled analysis on a wide range of topics.

== Introduction ==
The Advanced Concepts Team (ACT) is a multidisciplinary research group at the European Space Agency. Its task is to facilitate disruptive changes in space technology by performing solid research on "exotic" topics typically not considered by "mainstream" space science.

== History ==
The Advanced Concepts Team was instituted in 2002 within ESA’s General Studies Programme, with the objective of fostering advanced research on space systems, innovative concepts and working methods. Early ACT activities included studies on asteroid impact risk and deflection missions, solar power satellites, formation‑flying dynamics and biomimetics applied to space systems.

Over time, the team expanded its portfolio to encompass neuromorphic and bio‑inspired sensing, brain–machine interfaces in microgravity, novel propulsion concepts, trajectory optimisation, differential intelligence and machine‑learning‑based guidance and control, quantum computing reflecting the broad evolution of space technology and computational methods.

== Research Highlights ==
- (2003) The ACT initiates (in the framework of ESA's General Studies Programme) a number of ESA's asteroid mission studies related to impact risk assessment. The outcome is a phase A study on an asteroid deflection mission named Don Quijote. which will, in the years morph and eventually become the HERA mission.
- (2003) The ACT starts the first phase of the European Solar Power Satellite assessment. Trade offs between placing solar plants in orbit and in the ground are performed.
- (2004) The ACT introduces for the first time in ESA a systematic research of inspiration from biological solutions to approach space problems. Studies on biomimetics and space systems are started.
- (2004) The ACT starts the development of a distributed computing environment general for ESA computations.
- (2005) The ACT demonstrate that asteroid deflection is technologically possible in some cases and shows how to deflect the asteroid Apophis 99942 with a small kinetic impactor mission.
- (2005) The ACT finds numerical evidence that formation flying missions can benefit from two previously unknown special inclinations (49 degrees and 131) where the control effort is minimal due to a perfect match between the in-plane and the off-plane frequencies.
- (2005) The ACT initiates and organizes GTOC: an international competition on Global Trajectory Optimisation. The competition is conceived in the form of a kind of America's cup with the winner organizing the following edition.
- (2005) The ACT studies the DS4G propulsion concept allowing its ESTEC test that established the world record in achieved specific impulse. The ACT consequently proves that a mission to 200AU is possible in 22 years using the DS4G preliminary performance evaluation.
- (2006) The ACT starts to test Web 2.0 technologies as working methods in the European Space Agency. Wikis, subversions and other concurrent working environment are tried and developed.
- (2006) The ACT coordinates a European research effort to determine for the first time the effects of microgravity on the emerging techniques for interfacing, noninvasively, the human brain with a machine.
- (2007) US researchers confirm the ACT numerical findings on the magic inclinations.
- (2007) Researchers from the ACT test for the first time a brain machine interface in micro-gravity.
- (2008) The ACT make available on-line the first semantic database containing trajectories to Near Earth Objects.
- (2009) A first attempt to detect human curiosity from brain waves is done by the ACT in cooperation with EPFL and DCU.
- (2009) Elementary Motion Detectors inspired by the biological functioning principles of insect eyes are successfully used during a lunar landing simulation.
- (2009) The island model for parallel computations is made available and extended to non evolutionary algorithm in the open source software suite PaGMO.
- (2010) Participation in Google's initiative Summer of Code with its PaGMO open source platform. First time a space Agency opens up to open source development via such consolidated tools.
- (2010) The Space Game, an html5 web game developed by ACT researchers (also featured in Chromium experiments), is the most visited event of the 2010 World Space Week.
- (2011) Esa Summer of Code pilot project is invented, organized and successfully run by the team, proving the value of open source initiatives and tools for software development related to space.
- (2011) Evolutionary Robotics first time use in a space related application. The ACT successfully trained an artificial neural network to steer attitude and positions of the three MIT SPHERES on board the ISS.
- (2011) PyGMO V.1.0.0 is released. The ACT developed 'generalized island model', a coarse grained massively parallelization approach to global optimization, is available cross-platform to solve, in a massively parallel fashion, complex global optimization problems.
- (2012) A spacecraft landing is successfully carried out (in simulation) using only vision (without altimeter or any other exteroceptive clues), consuming 10% more mass than what would be optimal. This paves the way to a number of innovative ideas for micro vehicles and for backup landing system in larger spacecraft.
- (2012) 10th anniversary – ten years Advanced Concepts Team
- (2012) The team solves for the first time in an explicit analytical form the Post Newtonian two-spinning-body problem in the general relativity frame. The result is possible thanks to a careful use of Lie perturbation theory and Weierstrass elliptic P function.
- (2015) An ISS experiment proves for the first time robotic learning in zero-g (https://www.esa.int/Our_Activities/Space_Engineering_Technology/One-eyed_robot_learns_to_see_in_weightlessness)
- (2015) The team wins the eighth edition of the GTOC organized by JPL.
- (2015) A deep neural network architecture is successfully used, for the first time successfully, to optimally control simulated spacecraft and rocket descents.
- (2016) The Kelvins competition platform () is released. Machine learning and data mining communities are brought closer to ESA activities and space in general. The first Machine Learning competition organized by the ACT, called Mars Express Power Challenge, reveals to be a great success.
- (2016) The ACT produces a black hole visualisation interactive website.
- (2017) The ACT begins studies, and defines the field of "differential intelligence" contributing substantially to the soon to come trend on AI.
- (2017) The ACT develops deep neural networks for onboard real time optimal control (G&CNETs ), pioneering the use of Artificial Intelligence in a mission critical system.
- (2019) The Taylor method is adopted and a new modern software suite released (heyoka https://www.esa.int/gsp/ACT/open_source/heyoka/) able to produce orders of magnitude gains in space flight dynamics problems and beyond.
- (2020) Implicit Neural representations are developed for satellite photogrammetry .
- (2020) Event based vision is studied in the context of spacecraft navigation algorithms and payloads.
- (2021) Spiking Neural Networks are introduced in the context of "the neuromorphic spacecraft".
- (2022) geodesyNETs, eclipseNETs and G&CNETs are developed further proving the use of implicit neural representations in space flight mechanics and operations.
- (2024) Implicit neural representations of the thermosphere density are developed and reach unprecedented accuracy with small networks.

== See also ==
- NASA Institute for Advanced Concepts
- Concurrent Design Facility
