= ECSS-E-TM-10-25A =

ECSS-E-TM-10-25 "System Engineering - Engineering Design Model Data Exchange (CDF)" is a Technical Memorandum under the E-10 "System engineering" branch in the ECSS series of standards, handbooks and technical memoranda.

== Scope and Purpose ==
This Technical Memorandum facilitates and promotes common data definitions and exchange among partner Agencies, European space industry and institutes, which are interested to collaborate on concurrent design, sharing analysis and design outputs and related reviews. This comprises a system decomposition up to any level and related standard lists of parameters and disciplines. Further it provides the starting point of the space system life cycle defining the parameter sets required to cover all project phases, although the present Technical Memorandum only addresses Phases 0 and A. This Technical Memorandum is intended to evolve into an ECSS Standard in the future. In conjunction with related development and validation activities, this Technical Memorandum should be regarded as a mechanism for reaching consensus prior to building the standard itself.

The Technical Memorandum provides the basis for creating interoperable Concurrent Design (CD) centers across the European space community. Allowing semantically consistent data exchange between CD centers. Enabling and supporting joint real-time collaborative design activities involving multiple CD centers. The initial objective of the TM is thus to act as a reference for the creation of new CD centers or upgrade of existing ones.

== Structure ==
ECSS-E-TM-10-25A comprises the following parts:

- Clause 1: Scope
- Clause 2: Normative references
- Clause 3: Terms, definitions and abbreviated terms
- Clause 4: Background and concepts
  - Includes the description of the Space Engineering Information Model (SEIM), a conceptual data model for all information needed to conduct concurrent design sessions
  - Includes the description of the Space Engineering Reference Data Library (SERDL), an agreed collection of concurrent design organization roles, process concepts, disciplines and parameter types. These are predefined instances of SEIM concepts.
- Clause 5: A list of requirements that two or more parties that want to exchange data for a concurrent design activity shall comply with.
- Annex A: The formal definition of the Space Engineering Information Model (SEIM).
- Annex B: The formal definition of the Space Engineering Reference Data Library (SERDL).
- Annex C: The formal definition of the Web Services Interface and exchange file format.
- Annex D: An informative description of margins and reference frames.

== Software Implementations ==
Multiple software implementations of ECSS-E-TM-10-25A exist. These software implementations allow a team of engineers to collaborate on the design of a complex system such as a satellite, launcher, an oil rig or a building.

=== Open Concurrent Design Server (OCDS) ===
The Open Concurrent Design Server is a software package developed under a European Space Agency contract. It was the first attempt of an ECSS-E-TM-10-25A implementation. The software was never used in production and its further development was cancelled. The Open Concurrent Design Tool (OCDT) is the successor of the OCDS

=== Open Concurrent Design Tool (OCDT) ===
OCDT is a client / server software package developed under a European Space Agency contract to enable efficient multi-disciplinary concurrent engineering of space systems in the early life cycle phases. The OCDT client is an add-in for Microsoft Excel® 2010/2013, that is integrated with Excel® to perform simple analysis and simulation. Other client tools for engineering analysis and simulation can also be integrated, through the use of OCDT adapters. The OCDT server consists of a front-end web-services processor (using a REST API) and a back-end PostgreSQL database system for the persistent storage of OCDT shareable data. The server is able to support concurrent teams of more than 20 users and synchronising their engineering model content twice a minute or faster. Typically each user would represent a different domain of expertise (discipline). The package is distributed under an ESA community open source software licence available for use and further development to users that qualify as a member of the OCDT Community. OCDT is no longer being maintained.

The OCDT implements both Annex A (the formal UML model) and Annex C (the Webservices API).

=== RHEA Group Concurrent Design Platform (CDP4-COMET) ===
The Concurrent Design Platform (CDP4-COMET) of the RHEA Group is the main engineering tool to support multidisciplinary teams to perform Concurrent Design of complex systems. The CDP4-COMET, an evolution of the CDP3, is an ECSS-E-TM-10-25 Annex A and Annex C compliant implementation, as such it is 100% compatible with the ESA OCDT. CDP4-COMET is a client / server software solution implemented using C# and a Postgresql RDBMS. The CDP4-COMET Webservices (the server component) can be hosted both on Linux using Mono and Microsoft Windows®. The CDP4-COMET-IME is the desktop application that is compatible with Microsoft Windows® 7/10. A Microsoft Excel® 2010/2013 Add-in integrates many of the functionalities of the CDP4-COMET in Microsoft Excel® and is accessible through a dedicated Ribbon and Custom Task Panes. The CDP4-COMET implements both Annex A (the formal UML model) and Annex C (the Webservices API and exchange file format). The ESA CDF is using CDP4-COMET.

CDP4-COMET Community Edition is available as open source, the source code of the different components is available on GitHub:

Name	Description	Url
CDP4-SDK	The Concurrent Design Platform C# Software Development Kit that is compliant with ECSS-E-TM-10-25 Annex A and Annex C	https://github.com/RHEAGROUP/CDP4-SDK-Community-Edition
CDP4-SDKJ	The Concurrent Design Platform Java Software Development Kit that is compliant with ECSS-E-TM-10-25 Annex A and Annex C	https://github.com/RHEAGROUP/CDP4-SDKJ-Community-Edition
CDP4-WebServices	The Concurrent Design Platform Web Services that are compliant with ECSS-E-TM-10-25 Annex A and Annex C	https://github.com/RHEAGROUP/CDP4-WebServices-Community-Edition
CDP4-IME	The Concurrent Design Desktop Application and Excel Integration compliant with ECSS-E-TM-10-25 Annex A and Annex C	https://github.com/RHEAGROUP/CDP4-IME-Community-Edition
10-25 Integration test suite	ECSS-E-TM-10-25 Annex C integration tests	https://github.com/RHEAGROUP/ecss-10-25-annexc-integration-tests

The CDP4-SDK can be downloaded from Nuget. The CDP4-WebServices can be installed on any Linux flavor that supports Mono or using Docker.
