= Wagile =

Hybrid approach to software development

Wagile (also styled WAGILE or WAgile) is a hybrid software development approach that combines waterfall's structured, upfront planning with agile's iterative approach. It is also used in project management more generally.

Other terms exist for waterfall/agile hybrids. Dave West in 2011 introduced water-scrum-fall, which is sometimes called wagile. Agifall is another hybrid between waterfall and agile that entails introducing more strategy and planning to an agile project.

Wagile is often used when organisations are transitioning from a waterfall method to agile. It is sometimes criticised as a failed attempt to introduce agile processes, like short iterations, to something that is basically following a waterfall model.
