= Battle of Cape St. Vincent =

Battle of Cape St. Vincent may refer to:

- Battle of Cape St. Vincent (1337), a victory of a Castilian fleet over a Portuguese fleet during the brief Luso-Castilian War.
- Battle of Cape St. Vincent (1606), a victory of a Spanish fleet over a Dutch fleet in the Eighty Years War
- Battle of Cape St. Vincent (1641), a victory of a Spanish fleet over a Dutch fleet, also in the Eighty Years War
- Action of 30 September 1681, a victory of a Spanish fleet over a Brandenburger squadron
- Battle of Cape St. Vincent (1693), a victory of a French fleet over an Anglo-Dutch fleet in the Nine Years' War
- Battle of Cape St. Vincent (1719), a victory of a Spanish fleet over a British squadron in the War of the Quadruple Alliance
- Action of 28 November 1751, a Spanish victory over an Algerian squadron
- Battle of Cape St. Vincent (1780), a victory of a British fleet over a Spanish squadron in the American Revolutionary War
- Battle of the Levant Convoy (1795), a French victory over an escorted British convoy during the French Revolutionary War
- Battle of Cape St. Vincent (1797), a British victory over the Spanish in the Anglo-Spanish War (1796–1808)
- Battle of Cape St. Vincent (1833), a victory of the fleet of Maria II of Portugal over the fleet of Miguel of Portugal in the Liberal Wars

== See also ==
- Cape St. Vincent (disambiguation)
