= Monitoring Maintenance Lifecycle =

Software development process

The Monitoring Maintenance Lifecycle (MML) is a monitoring development process to lower maintenance expenses and improve the dependability of IT infrastructure with regard to service recovery-related issues. It is based on the classical Waterfall model.

Monitoring Maintenance Lifecycle are methods and standards for improving and mastering maintenance processes, supporting processes and management processes throughout the monitoring lifecycle.

The quest for the optimized mix of processes has resulted in different standards throughout the history. One of the latest which was published is the ISO/IEC 12207 standard. This standard was proposed in 1988 and published in August 1995. It was created to establish a common international framework to acquire, supply, develop, operate, and maintain.

ISO/IEC 12207 consists of three types of processes:

- Primary lifecycle processes;
- Supporting lifecycle processes;
- Organizational lifecycle processes.

== Supply ==
During the supply phase a project management plan is developed based on RUP. This plan contains information about the project such as different milestones that need to be reached. This project management plan is needed in the start up phase and throughout the monitoring and maintenance lifecycle.
