= Open implementation =

Open implementation in computer software

In computing, open implementation platforms are systems where the implementation is accessible. Open implementation allows developers of a program to alter pieces of the underlying software to fit their specific needs. With this technique, it is far easier to write general tools, though it makes the programs themselves more complex to design and use.

There are also open language implementations, which make aspects of the language implementation accessible to application programmers.

Open implementation is not to be confused with open source, which allows users to change implementation source code, rather than using existing application programming interfaces.

== See also ==
- Aspect-oriented programming as a successor concept in research
- Metaobject protocol for the primary implementation means
- Software architecture for organization of software in general
