= Emergent design =

Emergent design is a phrase coined by David Cavallo to describe a theoretical framework for the implementation of systemic change in education and learning environments. This examines how choice of design methodology contributes to the success or failure of education reforms through studies in Thailand. It is related to the theories of situated learning and of constructionist learning. The term constructionism was coined by Seymour Papert under whom Cavallo studied. Emergent design holds that education systems cannot adapt effectively to technology change unless the education is rooted in the existing skills and needs of the local culture.

== Applications ==
The most notable non-theoretical application of the principles of emergent design is in the OLPC, whose concept work is supported in Cavallo's paper "Models of growth — towards fundamental change in learning environment".

== Emergent design in agile software development ==
Emergent design is a consistent topic in agile software development, as a result of the methodology's focus on delivering small pieces of working code with business value. With emergent design, a development organization starts delivering functionality and lets the design emerge. Development will take a piece of functionality A and implement it using best practices and proper test coverage and then move on to delivering functionality B. Once B is built, or while it is being built, the organization will look at what A and B have in common and refactor out the commonality, allowing the design to emerge. This process continues as the organization continually delivers functionality. At the end of an agile release cycle, development is left with the smallest set of the design needed, as opposed to the design that could have been anticipated in advance. The end result is a simpler design with a smaller code base, which is more easily understood and maintained and naturally has less room for defects.

== Emergent design for social change ==
Emergent design can also occur as a tool in social-change movements, such as a group of Canadian NGOs bringing together a group of civic leaders to discuss how their work scales up and scales deep. The Carold Institute and Ashoka Canada organised a series of events in 2013 to 2015. The project goals included (among others):

- Engage emerging leaders in redefining models and systems that will support a vibrant and dynamic civil society in Canada.
- Strengthen and broaden the impact of their leadership.
- Discover and disseminate new knowledge related to systems change and emerging systems.
- Share key learning, insights, innovative strategies and new models of engagement among participants and with key stakeholders and sponsoring organizations.

== Design theory ==
Andreasen, Hansen and Cash discuss emergent design in the context of industrial design and product development.
