= Open Concurrent Design Server =

The Open Concurrent Design Server (OCDS) is an initiative of the European Space Agency (ESA). The OCDS aims to provide the building blocks of a Concurrent, Collaborative and Distributed Engineering for the European Space Industry, using Open Standards Information Models and Reference Libraries.

The OCDS aims to be the vehicle to distribute ESA's Concurrent Design Facility Concurrent Design methodology and a set of tools to the space industry, organisations and academia. At the same time it distributes an open data exchange standard for early phase space system engineering and design activities described in ECSS-E-TM-10-25.

The OCDS helps the European Space Community to:

- Increase data management Capabilities, including life cycle data management
- Support the information longevity objective
- Achieve a hardware and software independent solution
- Optimise the design process
- Consolidate design models in a repository based on open standards
- Improve communication to contractors and partners, using open and publicly available standards (e.g. ISO, ECSS, etc.)
- Streamline the communications to other ESA corporate applications using model based integration
- Connect data to product assurance (PA/QA) activities.

== Industrial Consortium ==
The OCDS has been developed under ESA contract by a Consortium led by DNV with the support of EPMT, Daysha, and Critical as subcontractors.

== Status ==
The OCDS development was abandoned, the software was never used in production. The development was redirected to a new development called Open Concurrent Design Tool (OCDT).
