= Computerized system validation =

Process of quality control

Computerized system validation (CSV) (Computerised system validation in European countries, and usually referred to as "Computer Systems Validation") is the process of testing/validating/qualifying a regulated (e.g., US FDA 21 CFR Part 11) computerized system to ensure that it does exactly what it is designed to do in a consistent and reproducible manner that is as safe, secure and reliable as paper-based records. This is widely used in the Pharmaceutical, Life Sciences and BioTech industries and is a cousin of Software Testing but with a more formal and documented approach. The validation process begins with validation planning, system requirements definition, testing and verification activities, and validation reporting. The system lifecycle then enters the operational phase and continues until system retirement and retention of system data based on regulatory rules.

Similarly, The Rules Governing Medicinal Products in the European Union, Volume 4, Annex 11: Computerised Systems applies to all forms of computerized systems used as part of a GMP regulated activities and defines Computer System Validation Elements

== System requirement ==
Documented system requirements are required for CSV as they clearly stipulate the intended use of a computer system application. System requirements are gathered and documented in the system definition phase. System definition artifacts that reflect these requirements can include, but are not limited to, the following:

- User Requirements Specification: Specifies required aims of the system. As opposed to specifying nice-to-have aims of the system.
- Hardware Requirements Specification: Minimum hardware required to support the system.

== See also ==
- Software testing
- Software engineering
- List of software engineering topics
- Quality assurance
