= Compass (NASA) =

Conceptual spacecraft design group at NASA Glenn

Compass (often stylized as COMPASS), is a collaborative engineering team founded in 2006 in support of the LSAM (Lunar Surface Access Module) Design Study at NASA's Glenn Research Center in Cleveland, Ohio. The team primarily performs integrated vehicle systems analyses. Compass conducts studies, in which the team receives a request from a contractor to analyze a space system design. The group reviews the parameters of the design, conducts simulations, details the design, and drafts a final report. The team uses concurrent engineering methods and brings in specialists from multiple disciplines, as an approach to accelerate the design process. Compass conducts feasibility studies for conceptural spacecraft such as a Titan deep-sea submarine, or a nuclear-powered robot designed to burrow into Europa. The name "Compass" was originally based on an acronym that has since been deprecated (Collaborative Modeling for the Parametric Assessment of Space Systems).

== History ==
The Compass team shares many similarities with the NASA Jet Propulsion Laboratory's Team X group and the NASA Goddard Spaceflight Center Integrated Design Center Team. The team formally became Compass in 2006 as a response to a multi-center Lunar Lander Concept Design study led by the NASA Johnson Space Center (JSC).

== Projects ==
- Mars Ascent Vehicle (MAV), studied by Compass in 2010 was a concept for a lightweight rocket has a launch platform on top of it. Samples from the surface of Mars are transported into orbit by the rocket, where a ship can collect them and return them to Earth.
- Nuclear electric propulsion study in 2012. The conceptual spacecraft could transport a team of 6 astronauts into orbit around Mars for 400 days, and then return them to Earth. An electric ion thruster, powered by a 2.5 megawatt nuclear reactor, would serve as the propulsion system
- Europa Cryobot was a concept designed to tunnel deep through the ice of Jupiter's moon Europa to investigate life that might exist in the liquid ocean that lies underneath.
