= Traditional engineering =

Traditional engineering, also known as sequential engineering, is the process of marketing, engineering design, manufacturing, testing and production where each stage of the development process is carried out separately, and the next stage cannot start until the previous stage is finished. Therefore, the information flow is only in one direction, and it is not until the end of the chain that errors, changes and corrections can be relayed to the start of the sequence, causing estimated costs to be under predicted.

This can cause many problems; such as time consumption due to many modifications being made as each stage does not take into account the next. This method is hardly used today, as the concept of concurrent engineering is more efficient.

Traditional engineering is also known as over the wall engineering as each stage blindly throws the development to the next stage over the wall.

== Lean manufacturing ==
Traditional manufacturing has been driven by sales forecasts that companies need to produce and stockpile inventory to support. Lean manufacturing is based on the concept that production should be driven by the actual customer demands and requirements. Instead of pushing product to the marketplace, it is pulled through by the customers' actual needs.

== Sequential engineering stages ==
1. Research
2. Design
3. Manufacture
4. Quality Control
5. Distribution
6. Sales

== Disadvantages of sequential engineering ==
1. This orderly step-by-step process will bring control to complex projects but is very slow.
2. In today’s highly competitive market place this can lead to product failures and lost sales.

== See also ==
- Waterfall model
