= Tom Gilb =

American systems engineer, consultant, and author

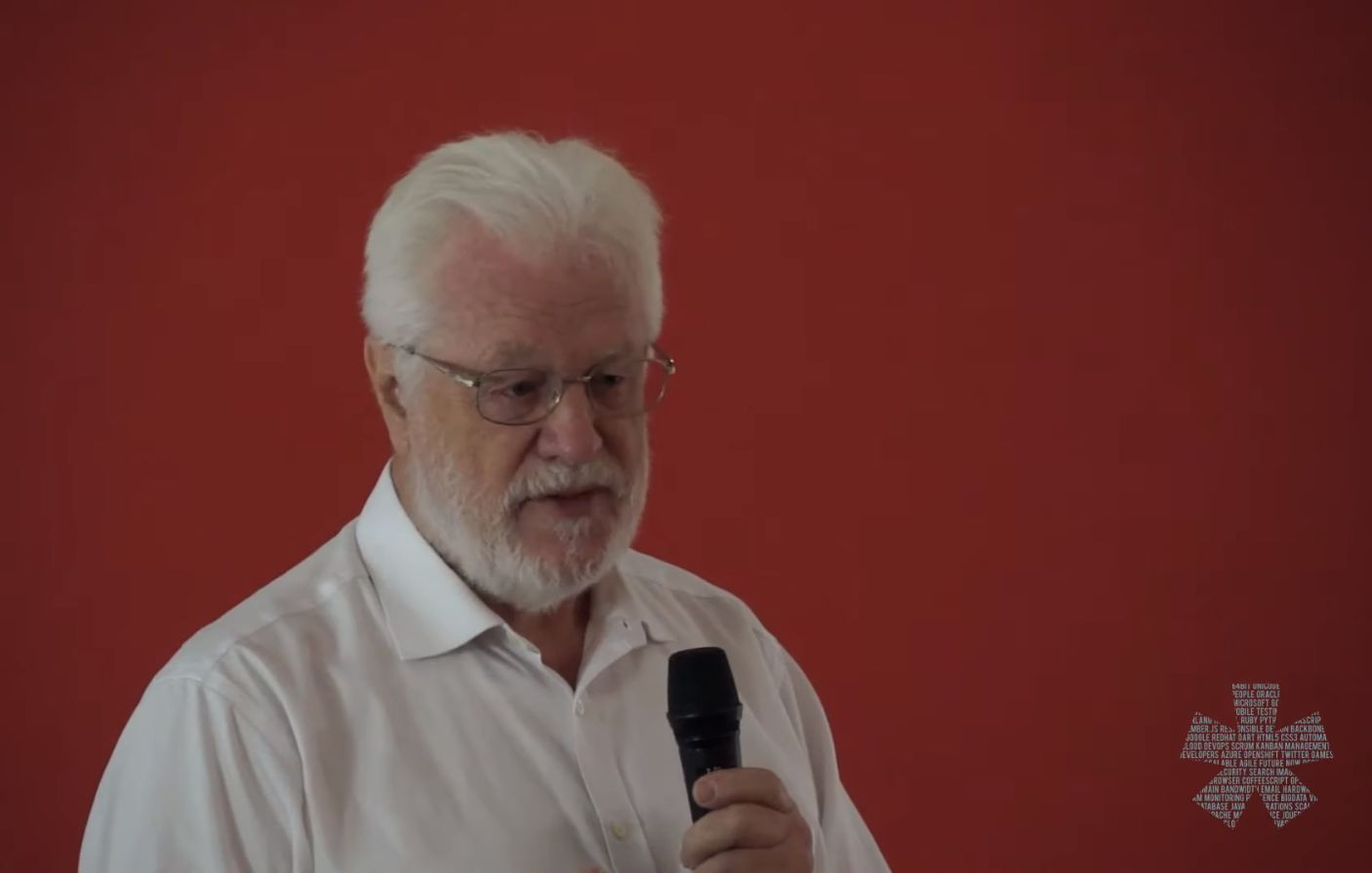
- Tom Gilb lecture Lean QA: Much more cost-effective Quality Assurance methods, than testing, 2014.
- Born: 1940 (age 85–86); Pasadena, California, United States
- Known for: Agile method; Planguage; Competitive Engineering
- Awards: British Computer Society Honorary Fellow (2012)
- Scientific career
- Fields: Logic; Computer science
- Workplaces: IBM

Tom Gilb (full name "Thomas Steven Gilb", born 1940) is an American systems engineer, consultant, and author, known for the development of software metrics, software inspection, and evolutionary processes.

== Biography ==
Tom Gilb was born in 1940 in Pasadena, California, United States. He emigrated to the United Kingdom in 1956 and to Norway in 1958. He took his first job with IBM in 1958 and became a freelance consultant in 1960.

He is known for his early work on evolutionary software development processes from 1968 to 1981, which was a forerunner of agile software development methods.

He is currently (at least in spring 2018) a consultant, teacher and author, in partnership with his son Kai Gilb. He mainly helps multinational clients improve their organizations and methods by using "evolutionary systems delivery" (Evo). His method is based upon the core ideas that all architecture focus has to be on delivering value to the stakeholders and that engineering principles and scientific methods must be used in planning and management of change projects using a formal engineering language like the one that he has developed and named "Planguage". He has "guest lectured at universities all over UK, Europe, China, India, USA, Korea – and has been a keynote speaker at dozens of technical conferences internationally".

He is a member of INCOSE and is active in the Norwegian chapter, NORSEC, which presented him with an award in 2003. He lectures at INCOSE local chapters on his worldwide travels and at INCOSE conferences.

In 2012 he was made an Honorary Fellow of the British Computer Society.

== Publications ==
Gilb has written nine books and several articles. A selection includes:

- Controlling the computer, 1974. ISBN 978-9144107912
- Software Inspection, 1993. ISBN 0-201-63181-4. (with coauthor Dorothy Graham)
- Principles of Software Engineering Management, 1988. ISBN 0-201-19246-2 (19th printing).
- Software Metrics (Winthrop computer systems series), 1977.
- Competitive Engineering: A Handbook for Systems & Software Engineering Management using Planguage, 2005. ISBN 0-7506-6507-6. (Planguage is a formal, natural language modelling notation invented by Gilb that adds rigour to the requirement documentation.)

== Sources ==
- "Tom Gilb, Author of Principles Of Software Engineering Management". LibraryThing.
- "Books by Tom Gilb". Goodreads.
