= Standard CMMI Appraisal Method for Process Improvement =

The Standard CMMI Appraisal Method for Process Improvement (SCAMPI) is the official Software Engineering Institute (SEI) method to provide benchmark-quality ratings relative to Capability Maturity Model Integration (CMMI) models. SCAMPI appraisals are used to identify strengths and weaknesses of current processes, reveal development/acquisition risks, and determine capability and maturity level ratings. They are mostly used either as part of a process improvement program or for rating prospective suppliers. The method defines the appraisal process as consisting of preparation; on-site activities; preliminary observations, findings, and ratings; final reporting; and follow-on activities.

== Class A, B, and C Appraisals ==
The suite of documents associated with a particular version of the CMMI includes a requirements specification called the Appraisal Requirements for CMMI (ARC), which specifies three levels of formality for appraisals: Class A, B, and C. Formal (Class A) SCAMPIs are conducted by SEI-authorized Lead Appraisers who use the SCAMPI A Method Definition Document (MDD) to conduct the appraisals. Class A, the most formal, is required to achieve a rating (Level 1 (lowest) to Level 5 (highest)), using the Staged Representation, for public record or for response to U.S. Department of Defense requirements.

== See also ==
- Anti-pattern
- Capability Maturity Model
- Capability Maturity Model Integration (newer)
- People Capability Maturity Model
- ISO/IEC 29110: Software Life Cycle Profiles and Guidelines for Very Small Entities (VSEs)
