= Managing by wire =

Managing by wire is a management strategy in which managers rely on their company's "information representation" generated by computers such as databases and software instead of on detailed commands.

It was presented by Stephan H. Haeckel and Richard L. Nolan in a 1993 Harvard Business Review article. The authors chose the term "managing by wire" as an analogue to the fly-by-wire concept for jets. SAP SE, Aetna, Mrs. Fields Cookies, and Brooklyn Union Gas have done "managing by wire".

== History ==
The concept was presented in an article titled "Managing by Wire" in the September–October 1993 issue of Harvard Business Review by Stephan H. Haeckel and Richard L. Nolan. When they wrote the article, Haeckel was the director of strategic studies at IBM's Advanced Business Institute and Nolan was a professor at the Harvard Business School. In his 2003 book The New Ruthless Economy, Simon Head called the article "an important milestone in the intellectual gestation of the corporate panopticon".

== Concept ==
The authors selected "Managing by Wire" as the title because readers would relate to the comforting, modern scene in the cockpit of an aviator carefully flying the jet to its destination. So as an analogue to "managing by wire", the authors presented a fly-by-wire concept for jets. According to fly-by-wire, a pilot must focus on general flight parameters while information technologies control the plane and reacts to changing environment. Instead of depending on their senses as they did in the past, pilots now are "flying by wire" by depending on the plane's "informational representation" generated by a computer. Likewise, when managers are "managing by wire", they are relying on their company's "informational representation", which includes "expert systems, databases, software objects, and other technical components". Rather than specifying step-by-step commands, managers would oversee their group through telling the software what their objectives are. The ability of a firm to "manage by wire" is based on how large and complicated its operations are.

== Industry applications ==
In their 2004 book, Managing Customer Relationships, Don Peppers and Martha Rogers cited several companies and organizations as having successfully used the "managing by wire" strategy in a limited fashion. For example, Mrs. Fields Cookies is using a tiny number of employees in rural Utah to manage 800 stores, some of which are owned by the company and some of which are franchised. They have the ability to do this through the use of computer systems that reproduce how founder Debbi Fields oversaw her flagship Palo Alto, California, store. In another example, to be able to resolve inquiries from their large number of customers in a speedy and efficient fashion, Brooklyn Union Gas "codified" a significant part of its customer service work such as the reading of meters and the collecting of due payments. Aetna, an insurance company, made related changes in the hopes of enabling their account executives to field client inquiries about novel services and products.

In a 2007 article in Defense Acquisition University's Defense Acquisition Review Journal, Russell A. Vacante suggested using "managing by wire" in the military. He said that logistics resources "can be better exploited" if they were to completely combine "logistics with operations and intelligence assets". Vacante noted that this will "reduce risk and uncertainty of delivery and support as the redundant iron mountains of equipment and supplies give way to precisely tailored packages distributed by a transportation network that can transverse the full spectrum of the battle space".

According to Simon Head's 2003 book The New Ruthless Economy, the "Managing by Wire" article "clearly had a strong influence" on SAP SE, which created "its own real-life version of the 'management cockpit'" represented by a conference room. The room's four walls are papered in charts that give an overview of how the company is doing. The walls each have six rectangles, and each rectangle has six charts. In total, each wall has 36 charts which means the room has 144 charts. The charts display data about the "minute-by-minute activities of plants, offices, machines, assembly lines, managers, groups of employees, and even single employees". Each wall has a different color: a black wall displays the "main success factors and financial indicators", a red wall shows "market performance", a blue wall shows "the performance of internal processes and employees", and a white wall shows "the status of strategic projects". This allows the CEO and upper-level management to review the key performance indicators for the entire company, after which they can look into more precise information from enterprise resource planning software such as how well their employees are doing their work.
