= Core Education & Technologies =

Indian education company

Core Education & Technologies Limited
- Company type: Public company
- Industry: Education
- Founded: 2003
- Defunct: 16 July 2016
- Headquarters: Mumbai, Maharashtra, India
- Area served: UK, US, India & Africa, and Caribbean Countries
- Services: K12, Higher Education, Vocational Training, Providing Brick & Mortar and Service model worldwide
- Revenue: ▲ Rs. 1091 crore (2011)
- Number of employees: 3,125

CORE Education & Technologies Limited was an Indian global education company.

== Overview ==
The company was founded in 2003 and had its business operations in 3 continents. Their international headquarters were located at Atlanta and London. CORE had diversified into an integrated education company and provided solutions to 7 states in India, 3 Caribbean nations, 20 states in the US, 40 Institutions in UK and 8 African countries. They had at one point approximately 3,125 employees worldwide.

CORE was listed on the BSE (SCRIP CODE 512199)& NSE (CoreEDUTECH) and had been rated as 'The Fastest Growing IT Company' in the State of Maharashtra, India. CORE was a CMMi Level 5 and ISO 9001:2008 certified Company.

=== CORE milestones ===
2005

- CORE enters US Market with the acquisition of first US product company
- CORE acquires ECS

2006

- CORE achieves a $6.6 million multi-year state contract in Special Education from North Carolina

2007

- CORE establishes its presence in the UK with the acquisition of Hamlet, Symbia and a division of Azzuri
- CORE acquires KC Management Group

2008

- CORE achieved a consolidated annual revenues in excess of US$100 million

2009

- CORE acquires, The Princeton Review's K-12 Services division
- CORE collaborates with the Oxford University for Teacher Training and Capacity Building

2010

- CORE established the CORE Learning Panorama, focusing on K-12 school segment

2011

- CORE acquires ITN Mark Education Ltd through its subsidiary Core Education & Consulting Solutions UK Ltd

2016

Forbes reports that CORE "tanked due to [an] unsustainable business model[s] and mounting debt[s]" and that its stock was suspended from trading.

== List of acquisitions ==
The table below gives some details of CORE's key acquisitions:

Year	Company	Business Segment	Country
2005	Enterprise Computing Services Inc.	Technology for Education, Healthcare & BFSI Products	United States
2006	Software Technical Services	Consulting & Project Management	United States
2006	Aarman	ERP & SAP Implementation	United States
2007	Emacs Technologies	ERP & ITeS Consulting	United States
2007	Azzurri	Learning Management Systems	United Kingdom
2007	KC Management Group	IT products for Education Sector	United States
2007	Symbia Ltd	Consulting and Training	United Kingdom
2007	Hamlet Computer Group	Assessment System	United Kingdom
2008	K12 Division of Princeton Review Inc.	Assessment & Intervention products for K12 segment	United States
2010	Keenan & Keenan Group	Education Staffing Solutions	United States
2010	Technical Systems Integrators	Advance Technologies products for K12 segment	United States
2011	ITN Mark	Teaching assistance & Training	United Kingdom
2011	Xpedite Technologies Inc	Consulting and Training	United States

== Key alliances ==
- Center for Higher Learning – NASA
- Indira Gandhi National Open University
- University of Oxford, UK
- Microsoft Gold Partner
- Gujarat Knowledge Society & DVET
- Nationteacher.org
