= Watts Humphrey =

American pioneer in software engineering (1927–2010)

- Born: July 4, 1927; Battle Creek, Michigan, U.S.
- Died: October 28, 2010 (aged 83)
- Known for: Capability Maturity Model
- Awards: National Medal of Technology
- Scientific career
- Fields: Software engineering
- Institutions: IBM, Software Engineering Institute

Watts S. Humphrey (July 4, 1927 – October 28, 2010) was an American pioneer in software engineering who was called the "father of software quality."

== Biography ==
Watts Humphrey (whose grandfather and father also had the same name) was born in Battle Creek, Michigan on July 4, 1927. His uncle was US Secretary of the Treasury George M. Humphrey. In 1944, he graduated from high school and served in the United States Navy. Despite dyslexia, he received a bachelor of science in physics from the University of Chicago, a master of science in physics from Illinois Institute of Technology physics department, and a master of business administration from the University of Chicago Graduate School of Business.

In 1953 he went to Boston and worked at Sylvania Labs. In 1959 he joined IBM. In the late 1960s, Humphrey headed the IBM software team that introduced the first software license. Humphrey was a vice president at IBM.

In the 1980s at the Software Engineering Institute (SEI) at Carnegie Mellon University Humphrey founded the Software Process Program, and served as director of that program from 1986 until the early 1990s. The program was funded by the Department of Defense (DOD) because it was in need of a solution for software being developed that was defective, consistently late, and over budget. This program was aimed at understanding and managing the software engineering process because this is where big and small organizations or individuals encounter the most serious difficulties and where, thereafter, lies the best opportunity for significant improvement.

In 1987 Humphrey published an SEI Technical Report (CMU/SEI-87-TR-11) that defined five levels of process maturity: (1) Initial, (2) Repeatable, (3) Defined, (4) Managed, and (5) Optimized. In 1989 he described how to use the five levels for managing and improving software development processes in a book titled "Managing the Software Process" When SEI released the Capability Maturity Model (CMM) in 1991, it was based on the principles in his book. Subsequently, DOD required organizations that developed software for it to have at least a level 3 process maturity level. Humphrey also published books on the concepts of the personal software process (PSP) and the team software process (TSP). The five levels of process maturity were later adopted for use in two standards: ISO/IEC 15504 (later superseded by ISO/IEC TS 33061) and the Business Process Maturity Model (BPMM) published by Object Management Group (OMG). Both standards applied the five levels to processes in general, not just to software development processes.

Humphrey received an honorary doctor of software engineering from the Embry-Riddle Aeronautical University in 1998. The Watts Humphrey Software Quality Institute in Chennai, India was named after him in 2000. In 2003, Humphrey was awarded the National Medal of Technology. Humphrey became a fellow of the SEI and of the Association for Computing Machinery in 2008.

== See also ==
- Personal software process (PSP)
- Software quality
- Team software process (TSP)

== Publications ==
Humphrey is the author of several books, including

- 2011. Leadership, Teamwork, and Trust: Building a Competitive Software Capability. Addison-Wesley, Reading, MA.
- 2010. Reflections on Management: How to Manage Your Software Projects, Your Teams, Your Boss, and Yourself. Addison-Wesley, Reading, MA.
- 2006. TSP, Coaching Development Teams. Addison-Wesley, Reading, MA.
- 2006. TSP, Leading a Development Team. Addison-Wesley, Reading, MA.
- 2005. PSP, A Self-Improvement Process for Software Engineers. Addison-Wesley, Reading, MA.
- 2001. Winning with Software: An Executive Strategy. Addison-Wesley, Reading, MA.
- 1999. Introduction to the Team Software Process. Addison-Wesley, Reading, MA.
- 1997. Introduction to the Personal Software Process. Addison-Wesley, Reading, MA.
- 1996. Managing Technical People - Innovation, Teamwork and Software Process. Addison-Wesley, Reading, MA.
- 1995. A Discipline for Software Engineering. Addison-Wesley, Reading, MA.
- 1989. Managing the Software Process. Addison-Wesley, Reading, MA.
- 1958. Switching Circuits with Computer Applications. McGraw-Hill Book Company
