= Stephan H. Haeckel =

Stephan H. (Steve) Haeckel (born May 22, 1936) is an American management theorist and former director of Strategic Studies at IBM’s Advanced Business Institute, who developed the idea of the sense-and-respond organization as an adaptive enterprise.

== Life and work ==
Haeckel received a BS in engineering and an MBA from the Washington University in St. Louis. At IBM he has been a marketing executive in Europe, and on the corporate staff. In 2002 Haeckel retired as the Director of Strategic Studies of the Advanced Business Institute at IBM Palisades.

Haeckel has been a faculty member at the IBM Advanced Business Institute, and was one of the founding members of the Homeland Security Council of the American Management Association. He also served as the chairman of the Marketing Science Institute.

The idea of the sense and respond organization was first introduced in a 1993 article by Haeckel and Richard L. Nolan in Harvard Business Review, "Managing by Wire".

The online repository of intellectual capital on the Sense & Respond Post-industrial managerial paradigm provides access to articles, essays, perspectives and updates on the origin, development, theory, principles, competences and application case studies of Sense & Respond as a business concept.

== Selected publications ==
- Haeckel, Stephan H. Adaptive enterprise: Creating and leading sense-and-respond organizations. Harvard business press, 1999; 2013.

Articles, a selection

- Haeckel, Stephan H., and Richard L. Nolan. "Managing by wire." Harvard Business Review 71.5 (1993): 122-132.
- Carbone, Lewis P., and Stephan H. Haeckel. "Engineering customer experiences." Marketing Management 3.3 (1994): 8-19.
- Haeckel, Stephan H. "About the nature and future of interactive marketing." Journal of Interactive marketing 12.1 (1998): 63-71.
- Berry, Leonard L., Lewis P. Carbone, and Stephan H. Haeckel. "Managing the total customer experience." MIT Sloan Management Review, (2002).
- Haeckel, Stephan H. "Leading on demand businesses—Executives as architects". In: IBM Systems Journal 42 (3). 2003. pp. 405–413.
- Haeckel, Stephan H. "Peripheral vision: Sensing and acting on weak signals: Making meaning out of apparent noise: The need for a new managerial framework." Long Range Planning 37.2 (2004): 181-189.
