= Productora de Software =

CMMi 5 nearshore software development and outsourcing organization

Productora de Software S.A.S.
- Industry: Information Technology
- Founded: 1984
- Founder: Jorge Aramburo Siegert
- Headquarters: Medellín, Colombia
- Number of locations: 5 development centers (2020)
- Area served: North America, Europe, Latin America
- Products: ERP Solutions, Human Resource Information Systems, Online Banking Platforms, MRO Software, Software Frameworks and Application Servers.
- Services: Nearshore Software Development, application maintenance, software quality consultant, and risk management consultant.
- Revenue: US$33 million (2020)
- Number of employees: 600 (2020)
- Parent: Perficient
- Footnotes / references Acquired by Perficient Inc. in 2020

Productora de Software S.A.S. was a Colombian provider of software services that served the US, European and Latin American markets. In 2020, Productora de Software S.A.S. was acquired by Perficient Inc. (Nasdaq: PRFT).

Productora de Software S.A.S. was the first Latin American software company to achieve CMMI 5 Status, and the first in the Spanish-speaking world to receive the Software Process Achievement Award granted by the IEEE Computer Society and Carnegie Mellon's Software Engineering Institute. In 2018, PSL was selected to be part of the Global Outsourcing 100 List by the IOAP (International Association of Outsourcing Professionals)

It was located in Medellín, Colombia, with offices in Mexico and the US, and was one of the largest local software developers.

== History ==
During its history of over 35 years, PSL developed critical software applications for clients that range from organizations such as the Panama Canal and the largest banks in the region, to hundreds of small and medium businesses across different industry verticals.

In 2020, Productora de Software S.A.S. was acquired by Perficient Inc. for around US$70 million, expanding its operations to South America.
