= Testing Maturity Model =

The Testing Maturity Model (TMM) was based on the Capability Maturity Model, and first produced by the Illinois Institute of Technology. Its aim to be used in a similar way to CMM, that is to provide a framework for assessing the maturity of the test processes in an organization, and so providing targets on improving maturity.

The TMM has been since replaced by the Test Maturity Model integration and is now managed by the TMMI Foundation. To reflect modern systems engineering and align tightly with the newer CMMI framework, the model evolved into the Test Maturity Model integration (TMMi) under the stewardship of the TMMi Foundation. In June 2026, the foundation officially launched version 2.0 to fully adapt the framework for modern continuous delivery ecosystems, embedding Quality Engineering principles, Agile/DevOps methodologies, and validation guidelines for Artificial Intelligence (AI) into its structure.

The five Levels in the Testing Maturity Model
Level	Description
Level 1 – Initial	At this level an organisation is using ad hoc methods for testing, so results are not repeatable and there is no quality standard.
Level 2 – Definition	At this level testing is defined as a process, so there might be test strategies, test plans, test cases, based on requirements. Testing does not start until products are completed, so the aim of testing is to compare products against requirements.
Level 3 – Integration	At this level testing is integrated into a software life cycle, e.g. the V-model. The need for testing is based on risk management, and the testing is carried out with some independence from the development area.
Level 4 – Management and measurement	At this level testing activities take place at all stages of the life cycle, including reviews of requirements and designs. Quality criteria are agreed for all products of an organization (internal and external).
Level 5 – Optimization	At this level the testing process itself is tested and improved at each iteration. This is typically achieved with tool support, and also introduces aims such as defect prevention through the life cycle, rather than defect detection (zero defects).

Each level from 2 upwards has a defined set of processes and goals, which lead to practices and sub-practices.

== See also ==
- Enterprise Architecture Assessment Framework
- TMMi Foundation
