= Capability Immaturity Model =

Capability Immaturity Model (CIMM) in software engineering is a parody acronym, a semi-serious effort to provide a contrast to the Capability Maturity Model (CMM). The Capability Maturity Model is a five point scale of capability in an organization, ranging from random processes at level 1 to fully defined, managed and optimized processes at level 5. The ability of an organization to carry out its mission on time and within budget is claimed to improve as the CMM level increases.

The "Capability Im-Maturity Model" asserts that organizations can and do occupy levels below CMM level 1. An original article by Capt. Tom Schorsch USAF as part of a graduate project at the Air Force Institute of Technology provides the definitions for CIMM. He cites Anthony Finkelstein's ACM paper as an inspiration. The article describes situations that arise in dysfunctional organizations. Such situations are reportedly common in organizations of all kinds undertaking software development, i.e. they are really characterizations of the management of specific projects, since they can occur even in organizations with positive CMM levels.

Kik Piney, citing the original authors, later adapted the model to a somewhat satirical version that attracted a number of followers who felt that it was true to their experience.

== Levels ==
Finkelstein defined levels 0 (foolish), −1 (stupid) and −2 (lunatic). Schorsch changed the names and added level −3. Piney's structure, truer to the original, uses the terms incompetent, obstructive, antagonistic and psychotic.

=== 0: Negligent ===
The organization pays lip service, often with excessive fanfare, to implementing engineering processes, but lacks the will to carry through the necessary effort. Whereas CMM level 1 assumes eventual success in producing work, CIMM level 0 organizations generally fail to produce any product, or do so by abandoning regular procedures in favor of crash programs.

=== −1: Obstructive ===
Processes, however inappropriate and ineffective, are implemented with rigor and tend to obstruct work. Adherence to process is the measure of success in a level −1 organization. Any actual creation of viable product is incidental. The quality of any product is not assessed, presumably on the assumption that such assessment is unnecessary since if the proper process is followed, high quality is guaranteed. This is the most common level achieved by most organizations that pursue CMM ratings.

However, level −1 organizations believe fervently in following defined procedures, but lacking the will to measure the effectiveness of the procedures they rarely succeed at their basic task of creating work. This behavior is inherent in the CMMI evaluation process. Since many government agencies will only award contracts over a certain monetary value to organizations that can pass a CMMI-3 or higher SCAMPI appraisal, management may be willing to accept inefficiencies to win these lucrative contracts. Government contracting models in which organizations are paid not for the value of their products but by the number of hours spent building them reward organizations for performing non-value-added activities related to CMMI compliance. Thus, government contractors with CMMI ratings may be more profitable than non-CMMI rated companies regardless of the quality of the work they produce.

=== −2: Contemptuous ===
The organization's ineffectiveness has become apparent to the marketplace or the larger organization, which ignores or attempts to neutralize these unfavorable perceptions. Measurements are fudged to make the organization look good. Measures of activity (bugs fixed, lines of code written, hours worked) replace measures of productivity (% functions completed, test success rates). Volatility in specifications and schedules is recast as evidence of organizational "agility". Certifications on "best processes" are presented as evidence that the organization is performing optimally; poor results are blamed on factors outside the organization's control. The processes chosen typically omit or shortcut essential components of recognized methods (e.g. "6-week Six-Sigma" or "Lean CMM"), which are flexible and can cover both good and bad practices. The organization becomes committed to ineffective processes, leading to a feedback cycle of increasing disorganization.

=== −3: Undermining ===
Undermining organizations routinely work to downplay and sabotage the efforts of rival organizations, especially those successfully implementing processes common to CMM level 2 and higher. This behavior may involve competing for scarce resources, drawing those resources from more effective departments or organizations.

== See also ==
- Anti-pattern
- Capability Maturity Model
- Capability Maturity Model Integration (CMMI is an evolution that reflected the need for greater process integration over the predecessor Capability Maturity Model – CMM)
- ISO/IEC 29110: Software Life Cycle Profiles and Guidelines for Very Small Entities (VSEs)
- People Capability Maturity Model
- Standard CMMI Appraisal Method for Process Improvement SCAMPI Class A, B, C Appraisal
