= Process area (CMMI) =

Area of focus within a business model

The Capability Maturity Model Integration (CMMI) defines a process area as, "a cluster of related practices in an area that, when implemented collectively, satisfies a set of goals considered important for making improvement in that area." Both CMMI for Development v1.3 and CMMI for Acquisition v1.3 identify 22 process areas, whereas CMMI for Services v1.3 identifies 24 process areas. Many of the process areas are the same in these three models.

== Process Area Organization ==
In CMMI models, the process areas are organized in alphabetical order according to their acronym. However, process areas can be grouped according to maturity levels or process area categories.

== Maturity Levels: CMMI for Development ==
There are Five maturity levels. However, maturity level ratings are awarded for levels 2 through 5. The process areas below and their maturity levels are listed for the CMMI for Development model:

Maturity Level 2 - Managed

- CM - Configuration Management
- MA - Measurement and Analysis
- PMC - Project Monitoring and Control
- PP - Project Planning
- PPQA - Process and Product Quality Assurance
- REQM - Requirements Management
- SAM - Supplier Agreement Management

Maturity Level 3 - Defined

- DAR - Decision Analysis and Resolution
- IPM - Integrated Project Management
- OPD - Organizational Process Definition
- OPF - Organizational Process Focus
- OT - Organizational Training
- PI - Product Integration
- RD - Requirements Development
- RSKM - Risk Management
- TS - Technical Solution
- VAL - Validation
- VER - Verification

Maturity Level 4 - Quantitatively Managed

- OPP - Organizational Process Performance
- QPM - Quantitative Project Management

Maturity Level 5 - Optimizing

- CAR - Causal Analysis and Resolution
- OPM - Organizational Performance Management

== Maturity Levels: CMMI for Services ==
The process areas below and their maturity levels are listed for the CMMI for Services model:

Maturity Level 2 - Managed

- CM - Configuration Management
- MA - Measurement and Analysis
- PPQA - Process and Product Quality Assurance
- REQM - Requirements Management
- SAM - Supplier Agreement Management
- SD - Service Delivery
- WMC - Work Monitoring and Control
- WP - Work Planning

Maturity Level 3 - Defined (this includes the process areas that make up the previous levels; Maturity Level 3 is made up of the process areas in Level 2 and Level 3)

- CAM - Capacity and Availability Management
- DAR - Decision Analysis and Resolution
- IRP - Incident Resolution and Prevention
- IWM - Integrated Work Management
- OPD - Organizational Process Definition
- OPF - Organizational Process Focus
- OT - Organizational Training
- RSKM - Risk Management
- SCON - Service Continuity
- SSD - Service System Development
- SST - Service System Transition
- STSM - Strategic Service Management

Maturity Level 4 - Quantitatively Managed

- OPP - Organizational Process Performance
- QPM - Quantitative Work Management

Maturity Level 5 - Optimizing

- CAR - Causal Analysis and Resolution
- OPM - Organizational Performance Management

== Maturity Levels: CMMI for Acquisition ==
The process areas below and their maturity levels are listed for the CMMI for Acquisition model:

Maturity Level 2 - Managed

- AM - Agreement Management
- ARD - Acquisition Requirements Development
- CM - Configuration Management
- MA - Measurement and Analysis
- PMC - Project Monitoring and Control
- PP - Project Planning
- PPQA - Process and Product Quality Assurance
- REQM - Requirements Management
- SSAD - Solicitation and Supplier Agreement Development

Maturity Level 3 - Defined

- ATM - Acquisition Technical Management
- AVAL - Acquisition Validation
- AVER - Acquisition Verification
- DAR - Decision Analysis and Resolution
- IPM - Integrated Project Management
- OPD - Organizational Process Definition
- OPF - Organizational Process Focus
- OT - Organizational Training
- RSKM - Risk Management.

Maturity Level 4 - Quantitatively Managed

- OPP - Organizational Process Performance
- QPM - Quantitative Project Management

Maturity Level 5 - Optimizing

- CAR - Casual Analysis and Resolution
- OPM - Organization Performance Management

== Goals and Practices ==
There are two categories of goals and practices: generic and specific. Specific goals and practices are specific to a process area. Generic goals and practices are a part of every process area. A process area is satisfied when organizational processes cover all of the generic and specific goals and practices for that process area.

=== Generic Goals and Practices ===
Generic goals and practices are a part of every process area.

- GG 1 Achieve Specific Goals
  - GP 1.1 Perform Specific Practices
- GG 2 Institutionalize a Managed Process
  - GP 2.1 Establish an Organizational Policy
  - GP 2.2 Plan the Process
  - GP 2.3 Provide Resources
  - GP 2.4 Assign Responsibility
  - GP 2.5 Train People
  - GP 2.6 Control Work Products
  - GP 2.7 Identify and Involve Relevant Stakeholders
  - GP 2.8 Monitor and Control the Process
  - GP 2.9 Objectively Evaluate Adherence
  - GP 2.10 Review Status with Higher Level Management
- GG 3 Institutionalize a Defined Process
  - GP 3.1 Establish a Defined Process
  - GP 3.2 Collect Process Related Experiences

=== Specific Goals and Practices ===
Each process area is defined by a set of goals and practices. These goals and practices appear only in that process area.

== Process Areas ==
CMMI for Development, Version 1.2 contains 22 process areas indicating the aspects of product and service development that are to be covered by organizational processes. For a summary of process areas for each model, see these quick reference documents available on the SEI website:

- CMMI for Acquisition
- CMMI for Development
- CMMI for Services

=== Agreement Management (AM) ===
- A Project Management process area at Maturity Level 2

Purpose

The purpose of Agreement Management (AM) is to ensure that the supplier and the acquirer perform according to the terms of the supplier agreement.

Specific Practices by Goal

- SG 1 Satisfy Supplier Agreements
  - SP 1.1 Execute the Supplier Agreement
  - SP 1.2 Monitor Selected Supplier Processes
  - SP 1.3 Accept the Acquired Product
  - SP 1.4 Manage Supplier Invoices

=== Capacity and Availability Management (CAM) ===
- A Support process area at Maturity Level 3

Purpose

The purpose of Capacity and Availability Management (CAM) is to ensure effective service system performance and ensure that resources are provided and used effectively to support service requirements.

Specific Practices by Goal

- SG 1 Prepare for Capacity and Availability Management
  - SP 1.1 Establish a Capacity and Availability Management Strategy
  - SP 1.2 Select Measures and Analytic Techniques
  - SP 1.3 Establish Service System Representations
- SG 2 Monitor and Analyze Capacity and Availability
  - SP 2.1 Monitor and Analyze Capacity
  - SP 2.2 Monitor and Analyze Availability
  - SP 2.3 Report Capacity and Availability Management Data

=== Causal Analysis and Resolution (CAR) ===
- A Support process area at Maturity Level 5

Purpose

The purpose of Causal Analysis and Resolution (CAR) is to identify causes of selected outcomes and take action to improve process performance.

Specific Practices by Goal

- SG 1 Determine Causes of Selected Outcomes
  - SP 1.1 Select Outcomes for Analysis
  - SP 1.2 Analyze Causes
- SG 2 Address Causes of Selected Outcomes
  - SP 2.1 Implement Action Proposals
  - SP 2.2 Evaluate the Effect of Implemented Actions
  - SP 2.3 Record Causal Analysis Data

=== Configuration Management (CM) ===
- A Support process area at Maturity Level 2

Purpose

The purpose of Configuration Management (CM) is to establish and maintain the integrity of work products using configuration identification, configuration control, configuration status accounting, and configuration audits.

Specific Practices by Goal

- SG 1 Establish Baselines
  - SP 1.1 Identify Configuration Items
  - SP 1.2 Establish a Configuration Management System
  - SP 1.3 Create or Release Baselines
- SG 2 Track and Control Changes
  - SP 2.1 Track Change Requests
  - SP 2.2 Control Configuration Items
- SG 3 Establish Integrity
  - SP 3.1 Establish Configuration Management Records
  - SP 3.2 Perform Configuration Audits

=== Decision Analysis and Resolution (DAR) ===
- A Support process area at Maturity Level 3

Purpose

The purpose of Decision Analysis and Resolution (DAR) is to analyze possible decisions using a formal evaluation process that evaluates identified alternatives against established criteria.

Specific Practices by Goal

- SG 1 Evaluate Alternatives
  - SP 1.1 Establish Guidelines for Decision Analysis
  - SP 1.2 Establish Evaluation Criteria
  - SP 1.3 Identify Alternative Solutions
  - SP 1.4 Select Evaluation Methods
  - SP 1.5 Evaluate Alternative Solutions
  - SP 1.6 Select Solutions

=== Integrated Project Management (IPM) ===
- A Project Management process area at Maturity Level 3

Purpose

The purpose of Integrated Project Management (IPM) is to establish and manage the project and the involvement of relevant stakeholders according to an integrated and defined process that is tailored from the organization's set of standard processes.

Specific Practices by Goal

- SG 1 Use the Project's Defined Process
  - SP 1.1 Establish the Project's Defined Process
  - SP 1.2 Use Organizational Process Assets for Planning Project Activities
  - SP 1.3 Establish the Project's Work Environment
  - SP 1.4 Integrate Plans
  - SP 1.5 Manage the Project Using the Integrated Plans
  - SP 1.6 Establish Teams
  - SP 1.7 Contribute to Organizational Process Assets
- SG 2 Coordinate and Collaborate with Relevant Stakeholders
  - SP 2.1 Manage Stakeholder Involvement
  - SP 2.2 Manage Dependencies
  - SP 2.3 Resolve Coordination Issues

=== Measurement and Analysis (MA) ===
- A Support process area at Maturity Level 2

Purpose

The purpose of Measurement and Analysis (MA) is to develop and sustain a measurement capability used to support management information needs.

Specific Practices by Goal

- SG 1 Align Measurement and Analysis Activities
  - SP 1.1 Establish Measurement Objectives
    - Resources, People, Facilities and Techniques.
  - SP 1.2 Specify Measures
    - Information Needs Document, Guidance, Reference and Reporting.
  - SP 1.3 Specify Data Collection and Storage Procedures
    - Sources, Methods, Frequency and Owners.
  - SP 1.4 Specify Analysis Procedures
    - Rules, Alarms, SPC and Variance.
- SG 2 Provide Measurement Results
  - SP 2.1 Obtain Measurement Data
    - Actual, Plan, Automatic and Manual.
  - SP 2.2 Analyze Measurement Data
    - Evaluate, Drill Down, RCA.
  - SP 2.3 Store Data and Results
    - Store, Secure, Accessible, History and Evidence.
  - SP 2.4 Communicate Results
    - Information Sharing, Dash Boards, Up to Date, Simple and Interpret.

=== Organizational Process Definition (OPD) ===
- A Process Management process area at Maturity Level 3

Purpose

The purpose of Organizational Process Definition (OPD) is to establish and maintain a usable set of organizational process assets, work environment standards, and rules and guidelines for teams.

Specific Practices by Goal

- SG 1 Establish Organizational Process Assets
  - SP 1.1 Establish Standard Processes
  - SP 1.2 Establish Lifecycle Model Descriptions
  - SP 1.3 Establish Tailoring Criteria and Guidelines
  - SP 1.4 Establish the Organization's Measurement Repository
  - SP 1.5 Establish the Organization's Process Asset Library
  - SP 1.6 Establish Work Environment Standards
  - SP 1.7 Establish Rules and Guidelines for Teams

=== Organizational Process Focus (OPF) ===
- A Process Management process area at Maturity Level 3

Purpose

The purpose of Organizational Process Focus (OPF) is to plan, implement, and deploy organizational process improvements based on a thorough understanding of current strengths and weaknesses of the organization's processes and process assets.

Specific Practices by Goal

- SG 1 Determine Process Improvement Opportunities
  - SP 1.1 Establish Organizational Process Needs
  - SP 1.2 Appraise the Organization's Processes
  - SP 1.3 Identify the Organization's Process Improvements
- SG 2 Plan and Implement Process Improvements
  - SP 2.1 Establish Process Action Plans
  - SP 2.2 Implement Process Action Plans
- SG 3 Deploy Organizational Process Assets and Incorporate Experiences
  - SP 3.1 Deploy Organizational Process Assets
  - SP 3.2 Deploy Standard Processes
  - SP 3.3 Monitor the Implementation
  - SP 3.4 Incorporate Experiences into Organizational Process Assets

=== Organizational Performance Management (OPM) / Organizational Innovation and Deployment ===
- A Process Management process area at Maturity Level 5

Purpose

The purpose of Organizational Performance Management (OPM) is to proactively manage the organization's performance to meet its business objectives.

Specific Practices by Goal

- SG 1 Manage Business Performance
  - SP 1.1 Maintain Business Objectives
  - SP 1.2 Analyze Process Performance Data
  - SP 1.3 Identify Potential Areas for Improvement
- SG 2 Select Improvements
  - SP 2.1 Elicit Suggested Improvements
  - SP 2.2 Analyze Suggested Improvements
  - SP 2.3 Validate Improvements
  - SP 2.4 Select and Implement Improvements for Deployment
- SG 3 Deploy Improvements
  - SP 3.1 Plan the Deployment
  - SP 3.2 Manage the Deployment
  - SP 3.3 Evaluate Improvement Effects

=== Organizational Process Performance (OPP) ===
- A Process Management process area at Maturity Level 4

Purpose

The purpose of Organizational Process Performance (OPP) is to establish and maintain a quantitative understanding of the performance of selected processes in the organization's set of standard processes in support of achieving quality and process performance objectives, and to provide process performance data, baselines, and models to quantitatively manage the organization's projects.

Specific Practices by Goal

- SG 1 Establish Performance Baselines and Models
  - SP 1.1 Establish Quality and Process Performance Objectives
  - SP 1.2 Select Processes
  - SP 1.3 Establish Process Performance Measures
  - SP 1.4 Analyze Process Performance and Establish Process Performance Baselines
  - SP 1.5 Establish Process Performance Models

=== Organizational Training (OT) ===
- A Process Management process area at Maturity Level 3

Purpose

The purpose of Organizational Training (OT) is to develop skills and knowledge of people so they can perform their roles effectively and efficiently.

Specific Practices by Goal

- SG 1 Establish an Organizational Training Capability
  - SP 1.1 Establish Strategic Training Needs
  - SP 1.2 Determine Which Training Needs Are the Responsibility of the Organization
  - SP 1.3 Establish an Organizational Training Tactical Plan
  - SP 1.4 Establish a Training Capability
- SG 2 Provide Training
  - SP 2.1 Deliver Training
  - SP 2.2 Establish Training Records
  - SP 2.3 Assess Training Effectiveness

=== Product Integration (PI) ===
- An Engineering process area at Maturity Level 3

Purpose

The purpose of Product Integration (PI) is to assemble the product from the product components, ensure that the product, as integrated, behaves properly (i.e., possesses the required functionality and quality attributes), and deliver the product.

Specific Practices by Goal

- SG 1 Prepare for Product Integration
  - SP 1.1 Establish an Integration Strategy
  - SP 1.2 Establish the Product Integration Environment
  - SP 1.3 Establish Product Integration Procedures and Criteria
- SG 2 Ensure Interface Compatibility
  - SP 2.1 Review Interface Descriptions for Completeness
  - SP 2.2 Manage Interfaces
- SG 3 Assemble Product Components and Deliver the Product
  - SP 3.1 Confirm Readiness of Product Components for Integration
  - SP 3.2 Assemble Product Components
  - SP 3.3 Evaluate Assembled Product Components
  - SP 3.4 Package and Deliver the Product or Product Component

=== Project Monitoring and Control (PMC) ===
- A Project Management process area at Maturity Level 2

Purpose

The purpose of Project Monitoring and Control (PMC) is to provide an understanding of the project's progress so that appropriate corrective actions can be taken when the project's performance deviates significantly from the plan.

Specific Practices by Goal

- SG 1 Monitor the Project Against the Plan
  - SP 1.1 Monitor Project Planning Parameters
  - SP 1.2 Monitor Commitments
  - SP 1.3 Monitor Project Risks
  - SP 1.4 Monitor Data Management
  - SP 1.5 Monitor Stakeholder Involvement
  - SP 1.6 Conduct Progress Reviews
  - SP 1.7 Conduct Milestone Reviews
- SG 2 Manage Corrective Action to Closure
  - SP 2.1 Analyze Issues
  - SP 2.2 Take Corrective Action
  - SP 2.3 Manage Corrective Actions

=== Project Planning (PP) ===
- A Project Management process area at Maturity Level 2

Purpose

The purpose of Project Planning (PP) is to establish and maintain plans that define project activities.

Specific Practices by Goal

- SG 1 Establish Estimates
  - SP 1.1 Estimate the Scope of the Project
  - SP 1.2 Establish Estimates of Work Product and Task Attributes
  - SP 1.3 Define Project Lifecycle Phases
  - SP 1.4 Estimate Effort and Cost
- SG 2 Develop a Project Plan
  - SP 2.1 Establish the Budget and Schedule
  - SP 2.2 Identify Project Risks
  - SP 2.3 Plan Data Management
  - SP 2.4 Plan the Project's Resources
  - SP 2.5 Plan Needed Knowledge and Skills
  - SP 2.6 Plan Stakeholder Involvement
  - SP 2.7 Establish the Project Plan
- SG 3 Obtain Commitment to the Plan
  - SP 3.1 Review Plans that Affect the Project
  - SP 3.2 Reconcile Work and Resource Levels
  - SP 3.3 Obtain Plan Commitment

=== Process and Product Quality Assurance (PPQA) ===
- A Support process area at Maturity Level 2

Purpose

The purpose of Process and Product Quality Assurance (PPQA) is to provide staff and management with objective insight into processes and associated work products.

Specific Practices by Goal

- SG 1 Objectively Evaluate Processes and Work Products
  - SP 1.1 Objectively Evaluate Processes
  - SP 1.2 Objectively Evaluate Work Products
- SG 2 Provide Objective Insight
  - SP 2.1 Communicate and Resolve Noncompliance Issues
  - SP 2.2 Establish Records.

=== Quantitative Project Management (QPM) ===
- A Project Management process area at Maturity Level 4

Purpose

The purpose of the Quantitative Project Management (QPM) process area is to quantitatively manage the project to achieve the project's established quality and process performance objectives.

Specific Practices by Goal

- SG 1 Prepare for Quantitative Management
  - SP 1.1 Establish the Project's Objectives
  - SP 1.2 Compose the Defined Processes
  - SP 1.3 Select Subprocesses and Attributes
  - SP 1.4 Select Measures and Analytic Techniques
- SG 2 Quantitatively Manage the Project
  - SP 2.1 Monitor the Performance of Selected Subprocesses
  - SP 2.2 Manage Project Performance
  - SP 2.3 Perform Root Cause Analysis

=== Requirements Development (RD) ===
- An Engineering process area at Maturity Level 3.

Purpose

The purpose of Requirements Development (RD) is to elicit, analyze, and establish customer, product, and product component requirements.

Specific Practices by Goal

- SG 1 Develop Customer Requirements
  - SP 1.1 Elicit Needs
  - SP 1.2 Transform Stakeholder Needs into Customer Requirements
- SG 2 Develop Product Requirements
  - SP 2.1 Establish Product and Product Component Requirements
  - SP 2.2 Allocate Product Component Requirements
  - SP 2.3 Identify Interface Requirements
- SG 3 Analyze and Validate Requirements
  - SP 3.1 Establish Operational Concepts and Scenarios
  - SP 3.2 Establish a Definition of Required Functionality and Quality Attributes
  - SP 3.3 Analyze Requirements
  - SP 3.4 Analyze Requirements to Achieve Balance
  - SP 3.5 Validate Requirements

=== Requirements Management (REQM) ===
- A Project Management process area at Maturity Level 2

Purpose

The purpose of Requirements Management (REQM) is to manage requirements of the project's products and product components and to ensure alignment between those requirements and the project's plans and work products.

Specific Practices by Goal

- SG 1 Manage Requirements
  - SP 1.1 Understand Requirements
  - SP 1.2 Obtain Commitment to Requirements
  - SP 1.3 Manage Requirements Changes
  - SP 1.4 Maintain Bidirectional Traceability of Requirements
  - SP 1.5 Ensure Alignment Between Project Work and Requirements

=== Risk Management (RSKM) ===
- A Project Management process area at Maturity Level 3

Purpose

The purpose of Risk Management (RSKM) is to identify potential problems before they occur so that risk handling activities can be planned and invoked as needed across the life of the product or project to mitigate adverse impacts on achieving objectives.

Specific Practices by Goal

- SG 1 Prepare for Risk Management
  - SP 1.1 Determine Risk Sources and Categories
  - SP 1.2 Define Risk Parameters
  - SP 1.3 Establish a Risk Management Strategy
- SG 2 Identify and Analyze Risks
  - SP 2.1 Identify Risks
  - SP 2.2 Evaluate, Categorize, and Prioritize Risks
- SG 3 Mitigate Risks
  - SP 3.1 Develop Risk Mitigation Plans
  - SP 3.2 Implement Risk Mitigation Plans

=== Supplier Agreement Management (SAM) ===
- A Project Management process area at Maturity Level 2

Purpose

The purpose of Supplier Agreement Management (SAM) is to manage the acquisition of products from suppliers.

Specific Practices by Goal

- SG 1 Establish Supplier Agreements
  - SP 1.1 Determine Acquisition Type
  - SP 1.2 Select Suppliers
  - SP 1.3 Establish Supplier Agreements
- SG 2 Satisfy Supplier Agreements
  - SP 2.1 Execute the Supplier Agreement
  - SP 2.2 Accept the Acquired Product
  - SP 2.3 Ensure Transition of Products

=== Technical Solution (TS) ===
- An Engineering process area at Maturity Level 3

Purpose

The purpose of Technical Solution (TS) is to select design and implement solutions to requirements. Solutions, designs, and implementations encompass products, product components, and product related lifecycle processes either singly or in combination as appropriate.

Specific Practices by Goal

- SG 1 Select Product Component Solutions
  - SP 1.1 Develop Alternative Solutions and Selection Criteria
  - SP 1.2 Select Product Component Solutions
- SG 2 Develop the Design
  - SP 2.1 Design the Product or Product Component
  - SP 2.2 Establish a Technical Data Package
  - SP 2.3 Design Interfaces Using Criteria
  - SP 2.4 Perform Make, Buy or Reuse Analyses
- SG 3 Implement the Product Design
  - SP 3.1 Implement the Design
  - SP 3.2 Develop Product Support Documentation

=== Validation (VAL) ===
- An Engineering process area at Maturity Level 3

Purpose

The purpose of Validation (VAL) is to demonstrate that a product or product component fulfills its intended use when placed in its intended environment.

Specific Practices by Goal

- SG 1 Prepare for Validation
  - SP 1.1 Select Products for Validation
  - SP 1.2 Establish the Validation Environment
  - SP 1.3 Establish Validation Procedures and Criteria
- SG 2 Validate Product or Product Components
  - SP 2.1 Perform Validation
  - SP 2.2 Analyze Validation Results

=== Verification (VER) ===
- An Engineering process area at Maturity Level 3

Purpose

The purpose of Verification (VER) is to ensure that selected work products meet their specified requirements.

Specific Practices by Goal

- SG 1 Prepare for Verification
  - SP 1.1 Select Work Products for Verification
  - SP 1.2 Establish the Verification Environment
  - SP 1.3 Establish Verification Procedures and Criteria
- SG 2 Perform Peer Reviews
  - SP 2.1 Prepare for Peer Reviews
  - SP 2.2 Conduct Peer Reviews
  - SP 2.3 Analyze Peer Review Data
- SG 3 Verify Selected Work Products
  - SP 3.1 Perform Verification
  - SP 3.2 Analyze Verification Results

== Changes made in Version 1.2 ==
Only changes made to the set of Process Areas are considered here. For more information about the changes made to Version 1.2, see the Version 1.2 Release Notes or for the definitive list of changes, take the CMMI Version 1.2 Upgrade Training.

- The following Process Areas have been removed (all on Maturity Level 3):
  - Organisational Environment for Integration (OEI)
  - Integrated Teaming (IT)
  - Integrated Supplier Management (ISM)
- The following additions have been made within existing Process Areas:
  - IPM – SG3 and SG4 were eliminated, new SG3 was added (as an IPPD addition)
  - OPD – SG2 was added (as an IPPD addition)
  - OPF – two SPs were extracted from the old SG3 and combined with two new SPs to create the new SG3
  - REQD – SP3.5 was renamed Validate Requirements
  - SAM – SP2.1 was eliminated, two new SPs added in SG2
  - TS – SP1.2 was incorporated into RD SP 3.1
  - VER – SP3.2 was renamed Analyze Verification Results

== Changes made in Version 1.3 ==
Some significant improvements in CMMI-DEV, V1.3 include the following:

- High maturity process areas are significantly improved to reflect industry best practices, including a new specific goal and several new specific practices in the process area that was renamed from Organizational Innovation and Deployment (OID) to Organizational Performance Management (OPM).
- Agile practices have been included with an interpretation guideline and by adding notes to the applicable process areas in the introduction of the process area and on how to interpret agile practices.
- Improvements were made to the model architecture that simplify the use of multiple models.
- Informative material was improved, including revising the engineering practices to reflect industry best practice and adding guidance for organizations that use Agile methods.
- Glossary definitions and model terminology were improved to enhance the clarity, accuracy, and usability of the model.
- Level 4 and 5 generic goals and practices were eliminated as well as capability levels 4 and 5 to appropriately focus high maturity on the achievement of business objectives, which is accomplished by applying capability level 1-3 to the high maturity process areas (Causal Analysis and Resolution, Quantitative Project Management, Organizational Performance Management, and Organizational Process Performance).

For a more complete and detailed list of improvements, see http://www.sei.cmu.edu/cmmi/tools/cmmiv1-3/comparison.cfm. An overview of the changes is described in http://www.benlinders.com/2011/cmmi-v1-3-summing-up/.

== Process Areas, Categories, and Maturity Levels ==
Table: Process Areas, Categories, and Maturity Levels

| Process Area | Abbreviation | Category | Maturity Level |
|---|---|---|---|
| Causal Analysis and Resolution | CAR | Support | 5 |
| Configuration Management | CM | Support | 2 |
| Decision Analysis and Resolution | DAR | Support | 3 |
| Integrated Project Management | IPM | Project Management | 3 |
| Measurement and Analysis | MA | Support | 2 |
| Organizational Process Definition | OPD | Process Management | 3 |
| Organizational Process Focus | OPF | Process Management | 3 |
| Organizational Performance Management | OPM | Process Management | 5 |
| Organizational Process Performance | OPP | Process Management | 4 |
| Organizational Training | OT | Process Management | 3 |
| Product Integration | PI | Engineering | 3 |
| Project Monitoring and Control | PMC | Project Management | 2 |
| Project Planning | PP | Project Management | 2 |
| Process and Product Quality Assurance | PPQA | Support | 2 |
| Quantitative Project Management | QPM | Project Management | 4 |
| Requirements Development | RD | Engineering | 3 |
| Requirements Management | REQM | Project Management | 2 |
| Risk Management | RSKM | Project Management | 3 |
| Supplier Agreement Management | SAM | Project Management | 2 |
| Technical Solution | TS | Engineering | 3 |
| Validation | VAL | Engineering | 3 |
| Verification | VER | Engineering | 3 |

== Official sources ==
- Capability Maturity Model
- Capability Maturity Model Integration
