= Enterprise Architecture Assessment Framework =

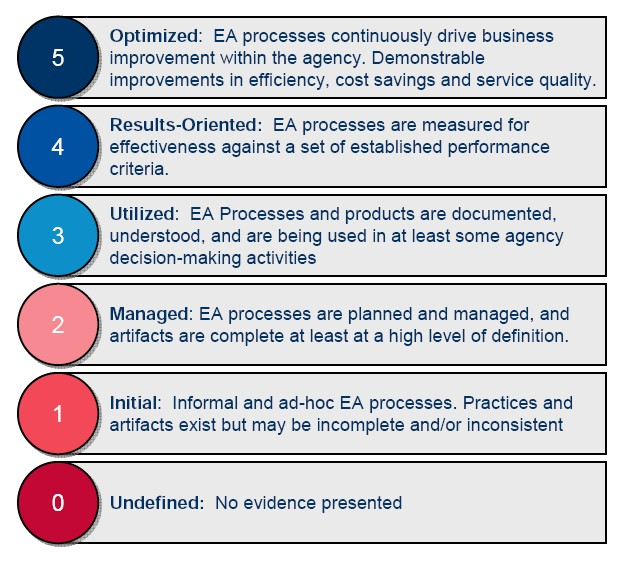
EAAF Maturity levels

The Enterprise Architecture Assessment Framework (EAAF) was created by the US Federal government Office of Management and Budget (OMB) to allow federal agencies to assess and report their enterprise architecture activity and maturity, and advance the use of enterprise architecture in the federal government.

The version 2.2 of the framework was released in October 2007, and version 3.1 in June 2009.

== Overview ==
The OMB Enterprise Architecture Assessment Framework (the Framework) helps OMB and the agencies assess the capability of enterprise architecture programs to guide IT investments. It helps to understand the current state of an agency's EA, and assists them in integrating it into their decision-making processes. By applying the assessment themselves, agencies can identify strengths and weaknesses within their programs, and adjust them accordingly.

Enterprise Architecture Assessment Framework (EAAF) version 3.1 identifies the measurement areas and criteria by which agencies are expected to use the EA to drive performance improvements that result in the following outcomes:

- Closing agency performance gaps identified via coordinated agency strategic planning and performance management activities;
- Saving money and avoiding cost through collaboration and reuse, productivity enhancements, and elimination of redundancy;
- Strengthening the quality of agency investment portfolios by improving security, inter-operability, reliability, availability, solution development and service delivery time, and overall end-user performance;
- Improving the quality, availability and sharing of data and information government-wide; and
- Increasing the transparency of government operations by increasing the capacity for citizen participation and cross-governmental collaboration.

While agencies have demonstrated a degree of maturity and competency in developing and using their EAs, EAAF seeks to advance the practice of EA, particularly through the development and use of agency segment architectures, aimed at driving the kinds of government-wide outcomes.

== Performance improvement lifecycle ==
Government agencies assess current performance, identifying opportunities for improvement, and translate them into specific actions. Enterprise architecture is an integrated management practice that helps the use of an agency's resources to achieve their goals. Architecture describes the pathway from strategic goals and objectives, through investments, to measurable performance improvements for the entire enterprise or a portion.

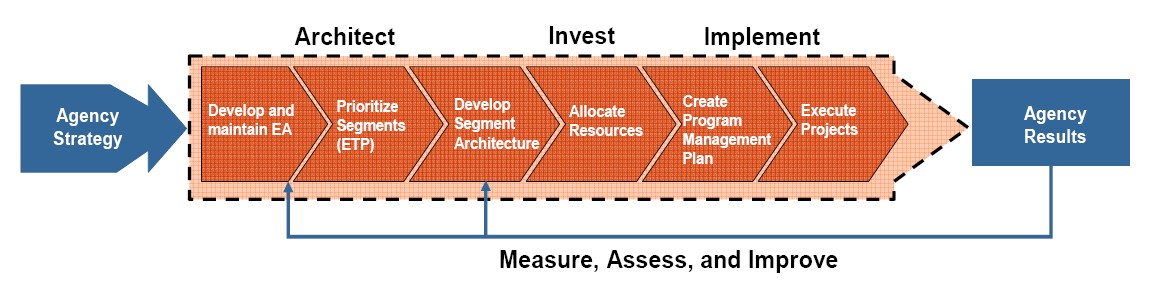
Information and IT-enabled performance improvement lifecycle

Continuous performance improvement is the principal driver connecting EA program staff with business stakeholders across each phase of the performance improvement lifecycle. Agency Chief Architects and EA program staff:

- identify and prioritize enterprise segments and opportunities to improve mission performance, linked to agency goals and objectives;
- plan a course of action to close performance gaps, using common or shared information assets and information technology assets;
- allocate agency resources supporting program management and project execution;
- measure and assess performance to verify and report results; and
- assess feedback on program performance to enhance architecture, investment and implementation decisions.

Opportunities to improve mission performance are prioritized in terms of their relative value to the agency's strategic goals and objectives in the enterprise transition plan (ETP) and segment architecture.

=== Architect ===
Enterprise architecture describes the current (baseline) and future (target) states of the agency, and the plan to transition from the current to the future state, with a focus on agency strategy, program performance improvements and information technology investments. Agency EAs are organized by segments – core mission areas (e.g., homeland security, health), business service (e.g., financial management, human resources), and enterprise services (e.g., Information Sharing). Segments are defined using the Federal Enterprise Architecture (FEA) reference models.

=== Invest ===
Performance improvement opportunities identified during the "Architect" process are ideally addressed through an agency portfolio of IT investments. This step defines the implementation and funding strategy for individual initiatives in the Enterprise Transition Plan (ETP) and described in the segment architectures. Program management plans are created to implement the individual solutions.

=== Implement ===
Projects are executed and tracked throughout the system development life cycle (SDLC). Achievement of the program / project plan within acceptable variance for schedule and budget is measured and reported through earned value management (EVM) process.

=== Measure, assess and improve ===
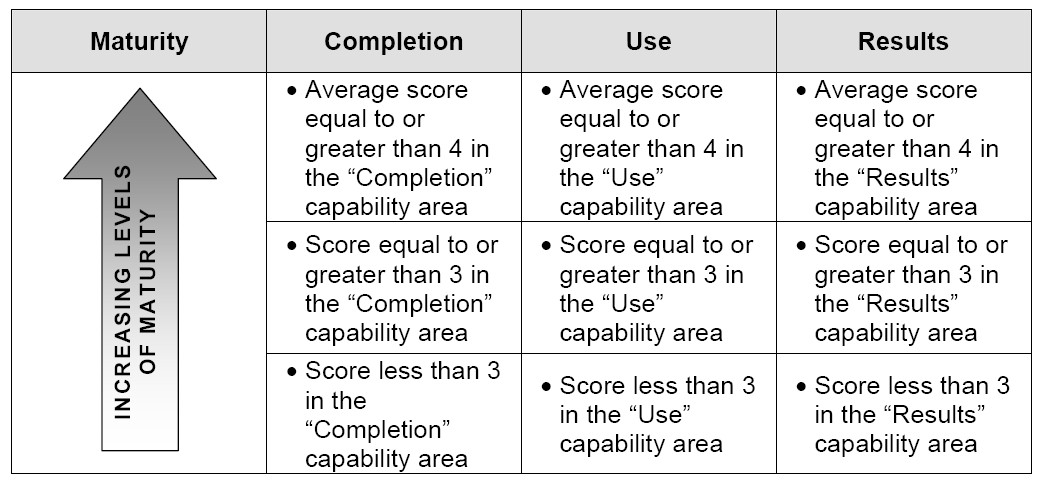
EAAF assessment table describing how agency EAs will be assessed.

Information and information technology, as critical enablers of program performance improvements, must be assessed and evaluated in the context of agency missions and outcome-oriented results defined in the enterprise-wide performance architecture.

Performance improvement plans and priorities, including those previously gathered under the PART and Performance Assessment Report (PAR) programs, are reflected in the agency EA, particularly the performance architecture and ETP. Performance metrics previously gathered are used to evaluate the results in agency performance improvement plans, identifying a program's strengths and weaknesses and addressing ways to improve the program performance.

=== Agency submission data quality ===
OMB collects a significant amount of IT investment data and other related data from executive agencies during each phase of Performance Improvement Lifecycle. OMB uses the information for development of an IT investment portfolio as a part of the President's budget request to Congress.

== See also ==
- Capability Maturity Model (CMM)
- Capability Maturity Model Integration (CMMI)
- Modeling Maturity Levels
