= Stages of growth model =

Model for growth of information technology in businesses

Stages-of-growth model is a theoretical model for the growth of information technology (IT) in a business or similar organization. It was developed by Richard L. Nolan during the early 1970s, and with the final version of the model published by him in the Harvard Business Review in 1979.

== Development ==
Both articles describing the stages were first published in the Harvard Business Review. The first proposal was made in 1973 and consisted of only four stages. Two additional stages were added in 1979 to complete his six-stage model.

== Summary ==
Nolan's model concerns the general approach to IT in business. The model proposes that evolution of IT in organizations begins slowly in Stage I, the "initiation" stage. This stage is marked by "hands off" user awareness and an emphasis on functional applications to reduce costs. Stage I is followed by further growth of IT in the "contagion" stage. In this stage there is a proliferation of applications as well as the potential for more problems to arise. During Stage III a need for "control" arises. Centralized controls are put in place and a shift occurs from management of computers to management of data resources. Next, in Stage IV, "integration" of diverse technological solutions evolves. Management of data allows development without increasing IT expenditures in Stage V. Finally, in Stage VI, "maturity", high control is exercised by using all the information from the previous stages.

=== Stage I – Initiation ===
In this stage, information technology is first introduced into the organization. According to Nolan's article in 1973, computers were introduced into companies for two reasons. The first reason deals with the company reaching a size where the administrative processes cannot be accomplished without computers. Also, the success of the business justifies large investment in specialized equipment. The second reason deals with computational needs. Nolan defined the critical size of the company as the most prevalent reason for computer acquisition. Due to the unfamiliarity of personnel with the technology, users tend to take a "hands off" approach to new technology. This introductory software is simple to use and cheap to implement, which provides substantial monetary savings to the company. During this stage, the IT department receives little attention from management and work in a "carefree" atmosphere.

Stage I Key points:

- User awareness is characterized as being "hands off".
- IT personnel are "specialized for technological learning".
- IT planning and control is not extensive.
- There is an emphasis on functional applications to reduce costs.

=== Stage II – Contagion ===
Even though the computers are recognised as “change agents” in Stage I, Nolan acknowledged that many users become alienated by computing. Because of this, Stage II is characterised by a managerial need to explain the potential of computer applications to alienated users. This leads to the adoption of computers in a range of different areas. A problem that arises in Stage II is that project and budgetary controls are not developed. Unavoidably, this leads to a saturation of existing computer capacity and more sophisticated computer systems being obtained. System sophistication requires employing specialised professionals. Due to the shortage of qualified individuals, implementing these employees results in high salaries. The budget for computer organisation rises significantly and causes concern for management. Although the price of Stage II is high, it is evident that planning and control of computer systems is necessary.

Stage II Key points:

- There is a proliferation of applications.
- Users are superficially enthusiastic about using data processing.
- Management control is even more relaxed.
- There is a rapid growth of budgets.
- Treatment of the computer by management is primarily as just a machine.
- Rapid growth of computer use occurs throughout the organisations' functional areas.
- Computer use is plagued by crisis after crisis.

=== Stage III – Control ===
Stage III is a reaction against excessive and uncontrolled expenditures of time and money spent on computer systems, and the major problem for management is the organization of tasks for control of computer operating costs. In this stage, project management and management report systems are organized, which leads to development of programming, documentation, and operation standards. During Stage III, a shift occurs from management of computers to management of data resources. This shift is an outcome of analysis of how to increase management control and planning in expending data processing operations. Also, the shift provides flexibility in data processing that is needed in a case of management's new controls. The major characteristic of Stage III is reconstruction of data processing operation.

Stage III Key points:

- There is no reduction in computer use.
- IT division's importance to the organization is greater.
- Centralized controls are put in place.
- Applications are often incompatible or inadequate.
- There is use of database and communications, often with negative general management reaction.
- End user frustration is often the outcome.

=== Stage IV – Integration ===
Stage IV features the adoption of new technology to integrate systems that were previously separate entities. This creates data processing (IT) expenditure growth rates similar to that of Stage II. In the latter half of Stage IV, exclusive reliance on computer controls leads to inefficiencies. The inefficiencies associated with rapid growth may create another wave of problems simultaneously. This is the last stage that Nolan acknowledged in his initial proposal of the stages of growth in 1973.

Stage IV Key points:

- There is rise of control by the users.
- A larger data processing budget growth exists.
- There is greater demand for on-line database facilities.
- Data processing department now operates like a computer utility.
- There is formal planning and control within data processing.
- Users are more accountable for their applications.
- The use of steering committees, applications financial planning becomes important.
- Data processing has better management controls and set standards.

=== Stage V – Data administration ===
Nolan determined that four stages were not enough to describe the proliferation of IT in an organization and added Stage V in 1979. Stage V features a new emphasis on managing corporate data rather than IT. Like the proceeding Stage VI, it is marked by the development and maturity of the new concept of data administration.

Stage V Key points:

- Data administration is introduced.
- There is identification of data similarities, its usage, and its meanings within the whole organization.
- The applications portfolio is integrated into the organization.
- Data processing department now serves more as an administrator of data resources than of machines.
- A key difference is the use of term IT/IS rather than data processing..

=== Stage VI – Maturity ===
In Stage VI, the application portfolio — tasks like orderly entry, general ledger, and material requirements planning — is completed and its structure “mirrors” the organization and information flows in the company. During this stage, tracking sales growth becomes an important aspect. On the average, 10% batch and remote job entry, 60% are dedicated to data base and data communications processing, 5% personal computing, 25% minicomputer processing. Management control systems are used the most in Stage VI (40%). There are three aspects of management control; manufacturing, marketing and financial. Manufacturing control demands forecasting — looking down the road for future needs. Marketing control strictly deals with research. Financial control, forecasts cash requirements for the future. Stage VI exercises high control, by compiling all of the information from Stages I through V. This allows the organization to function at high levels of efficiency and effectiveness.

Stage VI Key points:

- Systems now reflect the real information needs of the organization.
- Greater use of data resources to develop competitive and opportunistic applications.
- Data processing organisation is viewed solely as a data resource function.
- Data processing now emphasizes data resource strategic planning.
- Ultimately, users and DP department jointly responsible for the use of data resources within the organization.
- Manager of IT system takes on the same importance in the organizational hierarchy as say the director of finance or director of HR

== Initial reaction ==
Richard Nolan's Stages of Growth Model seemed ahead of its time when it was first published in the 1970s.

== Legacy ==
Critics agree that Nolan's model presents several shortcomings and is slightly out of date. As time has progressed, Richard Nolan's Stages of Growth Model has revealed some apparent weaknesses. However, many agree that this does not take away from his innovative look into the realm of computing development.

More recent research has shown that the stages of growth model does not necessarily reflect a fixed or sequential progression. Empirical studies suggest that organizations may skip stages, revisit earlier stages, or progress in alternative orders, indicating that growth patterns can be more fluid than originally proposed.

== Criticism ==
An argument posed dealt with the main focus on the change in budget, and whether it is “reasonable to assume that a single variable serves as a suitable surrogate for so much.” It seems logical that this single variable could be an indicator of other variables such as the organizational environment or an organization's learning curve, but not that it is the sole driving force of the entire model. Nolan shows little connection that would make his initial point a valid one.

In his model, Richard Nolan states that the force behind the growth of computing through the stages is technological change. King and Kramer find this to be far too general as they say, “there are additional factors that should be considered. Most important are the "demand-side" factors that create a ripe environment for technological changes to be considered and adopted.” As proposed, technological change has a multitude of facets that determine its necessity. Change cannot be brought forth unless it is needed under certain circumstances. Unwarranted change would result in excess costs and potential failure of the process.

Last, the stages of growth model assumes straightforward organizational goals that are to be determined through the technological change. This can be viewed as very naïve from the user perspective. King and Kraemer state, “the question of whether organizational goals are uniform and consistent guides for the behavior of organizational actors, as opposed to dynamic and changing targets that result from competition and conflict among organizational actors, has received considerable attention in the literature on computing.” Clearly, organizational goals are ever changing and sometimes rigid indicators of direction. They cannot be “uniform” objectives that are not subject to change.
