= People Capability Maturity Model =

People Capability Maturity Model (short names: People CMM, PCMM, P-CMM) is a maturity framework that focuses on continuously improving the management and development of the human assets of an organization. It describes an evolutionary improvement path from ad hoc, inconsistently performed practices, to a mature, disciplined, and continuously improving development of the knowledge, skills, and motivation of the workforce that enhances strategic business performance.

Related to fields such as human resources, knowledge management, and organizational development, the People CMM guides organizations in improving their processes for managing and developing their workforces. The People CMM helps organizations characterize the maturity of their workforce practices establish a programme of continuous workforce development, set priorities for improvement actions, integrate workforce development with process improvement, and establish a culture of excellence. The term was promoted in 1995, published in book form in 2001, and a second edition was published in July 2009.

== Description ==
The People CMM consists of five maturity levels that establish successive foundations for continuously improving individual competencies, developing effective teams, motivating improved performance, and shaping the workforce the organization needs to accomplish its future business plans. Each maturity level is a well-defined evolutionary plateau that institutionalizes new capabilities for developing the organization's workforce. By following the maturity framework, an organization can avoid introducing workforce practices that its employees are unprepared to implement effectively.

== Structure ==
People Capability Maturity Model

The People CMM document describes the practices that constitute each of its maturity levels and provides information on how to apply them to guide organizational improvements. It describes an organization's capability for developing its workforce at each maturity level. It also describes how the People CMM can be applied as a standard for assessing workforce practices and as a guide for planning and implementing improvement activities.

Version 2 of the People CMM has been designed to correct known issues in Version 1, which was released in 1995. It adds enhancements learned from five years of implementation experience and integrates the model better with CMMI and its IPPD extensions. The primary motivation for updating the People CMM was the error in Version 1 of placing team-building activities at Maturity Level 4. The authors made this placement based on substantial Feedback that it should not be placed at Maturity Level 3, as it had been in early review releases. Experience has indicated that many organizations initiate the formal development of workgroups while working toward Maturity Level 3. Thus, Version 2 of the People CMM initiates process-driven workgroup development at Maturity Level 3. This change is consistent with the placement of integrated teaming activities at Maturity Level 3 of the CMMI-IPPD.

== See also ==
- Capability Immaturity Model (CIMM)
- Capability Maturity Model (CMM)
- Capability Maturity Model Integration (CMMI)
