= Richard L. Nolan =

Richard L. Nolan (born c. 1940) is an American business theorist, and Emeritus Professor of Business Administration at the Harvard Business School.

== Biography ==
Nolan received his BA Production and Operations Research in various positions, including the Philip Condit Chair of Management at University of Washington and the William Barclay Harding Professor of Business Administration emeritus at Harvard Business School. A founder of consulting firm Nolan, Norton & Co. (acquired by KPMG), he contributed a great deal to the thinking on the role of IT (Information Technology) in transforming organisations and markets. He was conferred a Ph.D. in Operations Research from the University of Washington, although little of his work involves formal mathematical modeling.

Professor Nolan pioneered research and thinking on the topic of large scale IT management, authoring some of the earliest systematic treatments of this topic (e.g.), which articulated the first application of a staged maturity model — the Stages-of-growth model — to the stages of growth of enterprise IT.

This model is sometimes incorrectly confused with the much later process capability maturity model - the CMM, which was defined approx. 10 years later by Watts Humphrey in his Capability Maturity Model. Professor Nolan also collaborated with F. Warren McFarlan on a number of influential papers.

His 1995 Harvard Business School press book Creative Destruction: A Six-Stage Process for Transforming the Organization (with David C. Croson) heralded many of the organizational issues of the Internet age and sold over 15,000 copies in six languages.

== See also ==
- Stages-of-growth model
