= STUM =

STUM may refer to:

- Stand-up meeting, meeting at which attendees remain standing
- Solidarity Trade Union of Myanmar, a trade union in Myanmar
