= Mobbing (disambiguation) =

Mobbing is a term for bullying, especially by a group.

Mobbing may also refer to:

- Mobbing (animal behavior), behavior in which animals collectively harass or attack a predator
- Mobbing (Scots law), a form of mob violence under Scots law
- Mob programming, a software team working together at the same computer
