= Matthew Stevens (disambiguation) =

Matthew Stevens (born 1977) is a Welsh snooker player.

Matthew Stevens may also refer to:

== Sports ==
- Matt Stevens (rugby union) (born 1982), English rugby union player
- Matt Stevens (quarterback) (born 1964), American football quarterback
- Matt Stevens (safety) (1973–2025), American football safety
- Matty Stevens (born 1998), English football player

== Others ==
- Matt Stevens (musician) (born 1975), English musician
- Matthew Stevens (musician) (born 1982), Canadian jazz guitarist

== See also ==
- Matthew Stephens (disambiguation)
- Matthew Stevenson
