= Invest (disambiguation) =

To invest is to act for the goal of gaining a profitable return.

Invest may also refer to:

- Invest (meteorology), a potential tropical cyclone
- INVEST (mnemonic), a mnemonic in Agile software development

== See also ==
- Investment (disambiguation)
