= Matthew Stephens =

Matthew or Matt Stephens may refer to:

- Matthew Stephens (statistician) (born 1970), statistician and professor at the University of Chicago
- Matthew Stephens (cyclist) (born 1970), British road racing cyclist
- Matthew Stephens, co-creator of DeviantArt
- Matt Stephens (author) (born 1971), technology author
- Matt Stephens (politician) (1926–2017), Western Australian politician

== See also ==
- Matthew Stevens (disambiguation)
