= Kent Beck =

American software engineer

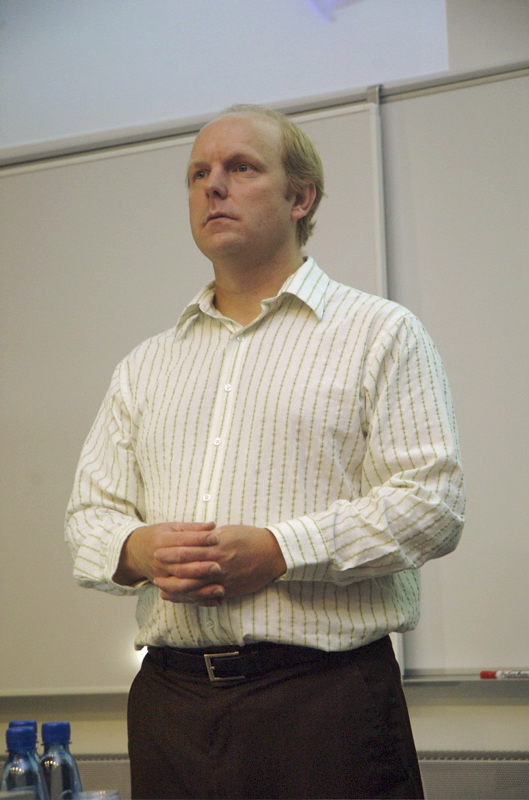
- Beck at a workshop in 2006
- Born: 1961 (age 64–65)
- Citizenship: United States
- Education: University of Oregon
- Known for: Extreme programming, Software design patterns, JUnit
- Scientific career
- Fields: Software engineering
- Workplaces: Gusto
- Website: kentbeck.com

Kent Beck (born 1961) is an American software engineer, author, and consultant best known for creating test-driven development (TDD), founding extreme programming (XP), and co-creating the JUnit testing framework. He was one of the seventeen original signatories of the Agile Manifesto, the founding document for agile software development.

== Biography ==
Beck attended the University of Oregon between 1979 and 1987, receiving B.S. and M.S. degrees in computer and information science.

In 1996 Beck was hired to work on the Chrysler Comprehensive Compensation System, the corporation's payroll system. Beck in turn brought in Ron Jeffries. At the time, Chrysler was using the waterfall method of software programming and the development process was running behind deadlines. Beck directed his team to adopt a different approach: they divided the project into smaller tasks, programed in pairs, and frequently tested and updated their code. Beck called the approach extreme programming (XP), developing 12 principles and publishing a book called Extreme Programming Explained: Embrace Change in 1999. Ultimately, the project was not completed, but it showed the viability of the XP style of programming. Some of the principles of XP were later included in agile methodology. Test-driven development (TDD) is an important element of XP. Beck published Test Driven Development: By Example in 2003. According to Beck, he "rediscovered" TDD in an older programming book.

Beck released JUnit, a Java testing framework, in 2000 with Erich Gamma.

In February 2001, Beck was among seventeen software practitioners who gathered in Snowbird, Utah, and signed the Agile Manifesto — a statement of values and principles intended to make software development more efficient and provide an alternative to heavyweight planning-driven development methodologies. Beck was a primary author of the manifesto's emphasis on individuals and interactions over processes and tools, and on responding to change over following a plan.

Beck worked at Facebook between 2011 and 2018. In 2019, Beck joined Gusto as a software fellow and coach, where he coached engineering teams as they build out payroll systems for small businesses.

== Publications ==
=== Books ===
- 1996. Kent Beck's Guide to Better Smalltalk: A Sorted Collection. Cambridge University Press. (ISBN 978-0521644372)
- 1997. Smalltalk Best Practice Patterns. Prentice Hall. (ISBN 978-0134769042)
- 1999. Refactoring: Improving the Design of Existing Code. Addison-Wesley. With Martin Fowler, John Brant, William Opdyke, Don Roberts. (ISBN 978-0201485677)
- 1999. Extreme Programming Explained: Embrace Change. Addison-Wesley. Winner of the Jolt Productivity Award. (ISBN 978-0321278654)
- 2000. Planning Extreme Programming. With Martin Fowler. Addison-Wesley. (ISBN 978-0201710915)
- 2002. Test-Driven Development by Example. Addison-Wesley. Winner of the Jolt Productivity Award. (ISBN 978-0321146533)
- 2003. Contributing to Eclipse: Principles, Patterns, and Plugins. With Erich Gamma. Addison-Wesley. (ISBN 978-0321205759)
- 2004. JUnit Pocket Guide. O'Reilly. (ISBN 978-0596007430)
- 2004. Extreme Programming Explained: Embrace Change, 2nd Edition. With Cynthia Andres. Addison-Wesley. Completely rewritten. (ISBN 978-0201616415)
- 2007. Implementation Patterns. Addison-Wesley. (ISBN 978-0321413093)
- 2023. Tidy First?: A Personal Exercise in Empirical Software Design. O'Reilly. (ISBN 978-1098151249)
- 2026. Tidy Together: A Team Exercise in Empirical Software Design. O'Reilly. (ISBN 978-1-0981-7876-5)

=== Selected papers ===
- 1987. "Using Pattern Languages for Object-Oriented Programs". With Ward Cunningham. OOPSLA'87.
- 1989. "A Laboratory For Teaching Object-Oriented Thinking". With Ward Cunningham. OOPSLA'89.
- 1989. "Simple Smalltalk Testing: With Patterns". SUnit framework, origin of xUnit frameworks.
