= Mike Cohn =

American software developer (born 1962)

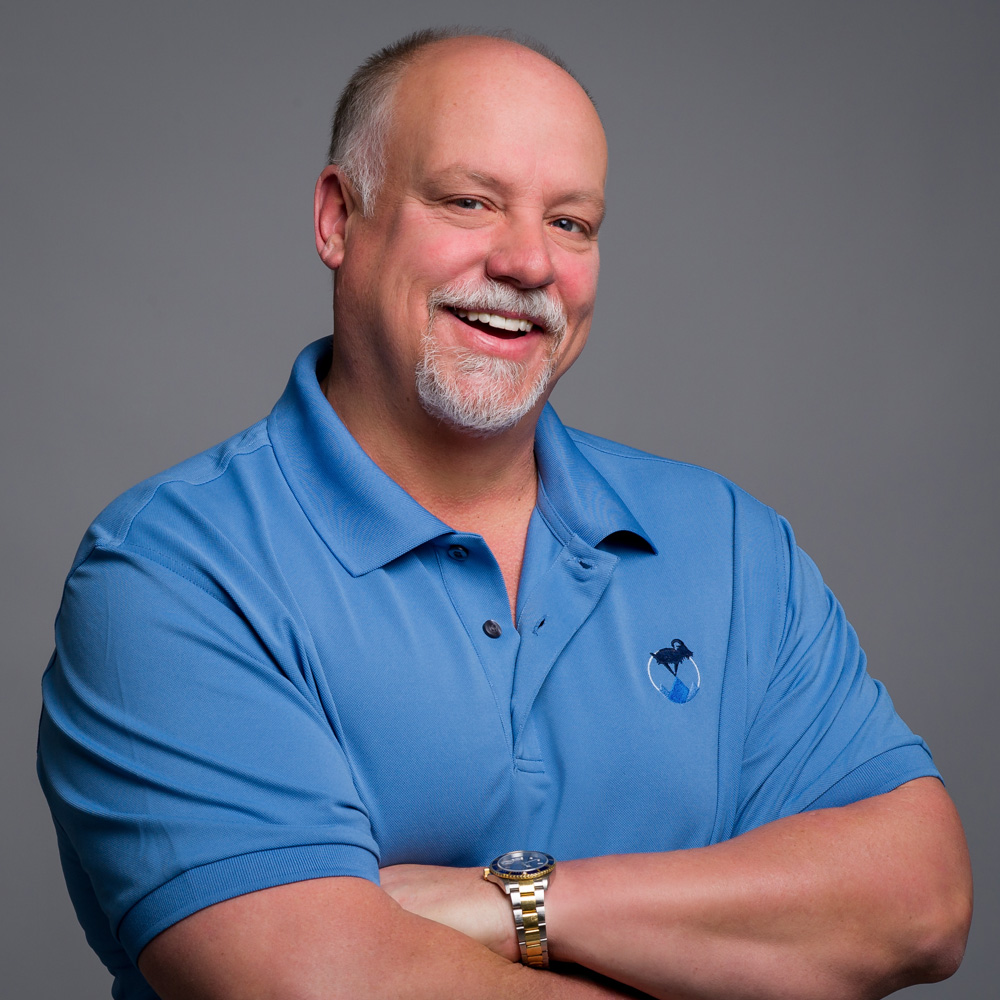
- Born: August 25, 1962 (age 63); Anaheim, California, U.S.
- Education: Chapman University (BA); Claremont Graduate University (MA); University of Idaho (MS)
- Known for: Founder of Scrum Alliance
- Spouse: Laura Cohn

Mike Cohn (born August 25, 1962) is one of the contributors to the Scrum software development method. He is one of the founders of the Scrum Alliance.

== Early life and education ==
Born in Anaheim, California, U.S. in 1962, Mike Cohn received his master's degree in computer science from the University of Idaho in northern Idaho. Having a research interest in Agile project management, he specializes in communicating needs and achieving Agile project goals through user stories.

== Career ==
Cohn began his career in the early 1980s as a programmer in APL and BASIC before moving on to C++ and Java and running development groups.

Cohn is the founder of Mountain Goat Software, a process and project management consultancy and training firm. He is the author of Agile Estimating and Planning, User Stories Applied for Agile Software Development and Succeeding with Agile: Software Development using Scrum, as well as books on Java and C++ programming. Cohn was a keynote speaker on ADAPTing to Agile for Continued Success at the Agile 2010 Presented by the Agile Alliance. In 2012, Cohn was named #1 in The Top 20 Most Influential Agile People.

Cohn is a proponent of stand-up meeting, particularly emphasizing actual standing during them. Teams are encouraged to come up with their own rules for improving these meetings, for example fining people who are late to them. A 2011 survey of tech employees from around the world found that 78% held daily stand-up-meetings.

Cohn created the SPIDR technique for user story splitting.

== Publications ==
- Java Developer's Reference (1996).
- Database Developer's Guide With Borland C++5: (Sams Developers Guide) (1996).
- Sams Teach Yourself Visual Café 2 in 21 Days (1997).
- Web Programming With Visual J++ (1997).
- Mike Cohn (2004). User Stories Applied: For Agile Software Development. Addison-Wesley Professional.
- Mike Cohn (2005). Agile Estimating and Planning. Prentice Hall PTR.
- Mike Cohn (2009). Succeeding with Agile: Software Development using Scrum. Addison-Wesley Professional.
