= Lean integration =

Lean integration is a management system that emphasizes creating value for customers, continuous improvement, and eliminating waste as a sustainable data integration and system integration practice. Lean integration has parallels with other lean disciplines such as lean manufacturing, lean IT, and lean software development. It is a specialized collection of tools and techniques that address the unique challenges associated with seamlessly combining information and processes from systems that were independently developed, are based on incompatible data models, and remain independently managed, to achieve a cohesive holistic operation.

== History ==
Lean integration was first introduced by John Schmidt in a series of blog articles starting in January 2009 entitled 10 Weeks To Lean Integration. This was followed by a white paper on the topic in April 2009 and the book Lean Integration, An Integration Factory Approach to Business Agility in May 2010.

== Overview ==
Lean integration builds on the same set of principles that were developed for lean manufacturing and lean software development which is based on the Toyota Production System. Integration solutions can be broadly categorized as either Process Integration or Data Integration.

The book is based on the premise that Integration is an ongoing activity and not a one-time activity; therefore integration should be viewed as a long term strategy for an organization. John Schmidt and David Lyle initially articulated in their book the reasons for maintaining an efficient and sustainable integration team. Lean integration as an integration approach must be sustainable and holistic unlike other integration approaches that either tackle only a part of the problem or tackle the problem for a short period of time. Lean integration drives elimination of waste by adopting reusable elements, high automation and quality improvements. Lean is a data-driven, fact-based methodology that relies on metrics to ensure that the quality and performance are maintained at a high level.

An organizational focus is required for the implementation of lean integration principles. The predominant organizational model is the Integration Competency Center which may be structured as a central group or a more loosely coupled federated team.

== Lean integration principles ==
The principles of Lean Integration may at first glance appear similar to that of Six Sigma but there are some very clear differences between them. Six-Sigma is an analytical technique that focuses on quality and reduction of defects while Lean is a management system that focuses on delivering value to the end customer by continuously improving value delivery processes. Lean provides a robust framework that facilitates improving efficiency and effectiveness by focusing on critical customer requirements.

As mentioned in lean integration there are seven core lean integration principles vital for deriving significant and sustainable business benefits. They are as below:

1. Focus on the customer and eliminate waste: Waste elimination should be viewed from the customer perspective and all activities that do not add value to the customer needs to be looked at closely and eliminated or reduced. In an integration context, the customer is often an internal sponsor or group within an organization that uses, benefits from, or pays for, the integrated capabilities.
2. Continuously improve: A data driven cycle of hypothesis-validation-implementation should be used to drive innovation and continuously improve the end-to-end process. Adopting and institutionalizing lessons learned and sustaining integration knowledge are related concepts that assist in the establishment of this principle.
3. Empower the team: Creating cross-functional teams and sharing commitments across individuals empower the teams and individuals who have a clear understanding of their roles and the needs of their customers. The team is also provided the support by senior management to innovate and try new ideas without fear of failure.
4. Optimize the whole: Adopt a big-picture perspective of the end-to-end process and optimize the whole to maximize the customer value. This may at times require performing individual steps and activities that appear to be sub-optimal when viewed in isolation, but aid in streamlining the end-to-end process.
5. Plan for change: Application of mass customization techniques like leveraging automated tools, structured processes, and reusable and parameterized integration elements leads to reduction in cost and time in both the build and run stages of the integration life-cycle. Another key technique is a middleware services layer that presents applications with enduring abstractions of data through standardized interfaces, allowing the underlying data structures to change without necessarily impacting the dependent applications.
6. Automate processes: Automation of tasks increases the ability to respond to large integration projects as effectively as small changes. In its ultimate form, automation eliminates integration dependencies from the critical implementation path of projects.
7. Build quality in : Process excellence is emphasized and quality is built in rather than inspected in. A key metric for this principle is First Time Through (FTT) percentage which is a measure of the number of times an end-to-end process is executed without having to do any rework or repeat any of the steps.

== Benefits of lean integration ==
The Lean integration practices transforms integration from an art into a science, a repeatable and teachable methodology that shifts the focus from integration as a point-in-time activity to integration as a sustainable activity that enables organizational agility. Once an organization adopts the integration as a science it enhances the organization’s ability to change rapidly without comprising on the IT risk or quality thereby transforming the organization into an agile data driven enterprise. The following are the advantages derived by adopting the lean integration practices:

1. Efficiency: typical improvements are in the scale of 50% labor productivity improvements and 90% lead-time reduction through continuous efforts to eliminate waste.
2. Agility: Reusable components, highly automated processes and self-service delivery models improve the agility of the organization.
3. Data quality: quality and reliability of data is enhanced and data becomes a real asset.
4. Governance: metrics are established that drive continuous improvement.
5. Innovation: innovation is facilitated by using fact-based approach.
6. Staff Morale: IT staff is kept engaged with high morale driving bottom-up improvements.

== See also ==
- Integration Competency Center
- Lean software development
- Lean IT
- Data Integration
- Toyota Production System
