= Investment (disambiguation) =

Investment is time, energy, or matter spent in the hope of future benefits actualized within a specified date or time frame.

Investment may also refer to:

== Economics ==
- Investment (macroeconomics)
- Fixed investment, investment in physical assets such as machinery, land, buildings, installations, vehicles, or technology
- Inventory investment, the accumulation of unsold goods

== Other uses ==
- Parental investment, any parental expenditure (e.g. time, energy, resources) that benefits offspring
- Investment (military), the military tactic of surrounding an enemy fort (or town) with armed forces to prevent entry or escape
- Investment (film), a 2013 Marathi film
- Investment casting, an industrial process based on and also called lost-wax casting, one of the oldest known metal-forming techniques
- Cathexis, also known as investment, a psychoanalytic term describing an investment of libido

== See also ==
- Invest (disambiguation)
