= Chrysler Comprehensive Compensation System =

Accounting software project by the Chrysler Corporation

The Chrysler Comprehensive Compensation System (commonly referred to as "C3") was a project in the Chrysler Corporation to replace several payroll applications with a single system. The new system was built using Smalltalk and GemStone. The software development techniques invented and employed on this project are of interest in the history of software engineering. C3 has been referenced in several books on the extreme programming (XP) methodology. The software went live in 1997, paying around ten thousand people. The project continued, intending to take on a larger proportion of the payroll, but new development was stopped in 1999.

== Project history ==
The C3 project was initiated in 1993 by Tom Hadfield, the Director of Payroll Systems, under the direction of CIO Susan Unger. Hadfield had developed a small object-oriented prototype which inspired the project. Smalltalk development began in 1994, with the aim of creating a new system to support all payroll processing for 87,000 employees by 1999.

In 1996 software engineer Kent Beck was brought on to oversee development, as the system had not yet printed a single paycheck. Beck in turn brought in Ron Jeffries. In March of that year, the development team estimated that the system would be ready to go into production in around one year. In 1997 the development team adopted a way of working now formalized as Extreme Programming. Although there was a slight delay due to unclear business requirements, the system was launched just a couple of months later than the one-year delivery target.

The plan was to roll out the system to different payroll 'populations' in stages, but C3 never managed to make another release despite two more years of development. The C3 system paid 9,000 people, representing the "vast majority of monthly Chrysler salaries." Performance was initially a problem, with early estimates indicating it would take 1000 hours to run the payroll. However, profiling activities reduced this to approximately 40 hours, with another month's effort further reducing this to 18 hours. By the time the system was launched, the figure was down to 12 hours, and during the first year of production, performance was improved to 9 hours.

A few months after the initial launch, the project's customer representative, a key role in the Extreme Programming methodology, resigned due to burnout and stress, and could not be replaced.

Chrysler was bought out by Daimler-Benz in 1998, after the merger the company was known as DaimlerChrysler. DaimlerChrysler stopped the C3 project in February 2000.

Frank Gerhardt, a manager at the company, announced to the XP conference in 2000 that DaimlerChrysler had de facto banned XP after shutting down C3.
