= Continuous obsolescence =

Continuous obsolescence or perpetual revolution is a phenomenon where industry trends, or other items that do not immediately correspond to technical needs, mandate a continual readaptation of a system. Such work does not increase the usefulness of the system, but is required for the system to continue fulfilling its functions.

== Unintentional reasons ==
Continuous obsolescence may be unintentional. One type of largely unintentional case of continuous obsolescence occurs when the rising demand for graphics- and experience-intensive video games collides with a long development time for a new title. While a game may promise to be acceptable or even revolutionary if released on schedule, a delay exposes it to the risk of being unable to compete with better games released during the delay (e.g. Daikatana), or of being continually rewritten to take advantage of better technologies as they become available (e.g. Duke Nukem Forever). This last behavior is an example of a software development anti-pattern.

== Intentional reasons ==
Continuous obsolescence may also be intentional, for example when an application tries to include compatibility for the output of another widely used application. In this case, the software house responsible for the latter may vary its output format repeatedly, forcing the developer of the former to continuously expend resources to keep its compatibility up-to-date, rather than using those resources to expand features or otherwise make the product more competitive. Many accuse Microsoft of doing exactly this with the file formats used by its Office application suite.

== See also ==
- Planned obsolescence
