= Matthew Stevenson =

Matthew Stevenson may refer to:

- Matthew Stevenson (poet) (died 1684), English poet
- Matthew Stevenson (civil servant) (1910–1981), Scottish civil servant
- Matthew R. Stevenson, captain in the 1st Regiment of New York Volunteers
