= Mobbing (Scots law) =

Under the law of Scotland, mobbing, also known as mobbing and rioting, is the formation of a mob engaged in disorderly and criminal behaviour. The crime occurs when a group combines to the alarm of the public "for an illegal purpose, or in order to carry out a legal purpose by illegal means, e.g. violence or intimidation". This common purpose distinguishes it from a breach of the peace.

== "Mob" ==
In HM Advocate v Robertson (1842) 1 Broun 152, at 192 to 193, Hope L.J.-C. said in his direction to the jury:

An illegal mob is any assemblage of people, acting together for a common and illegal purpose, effecting, or attempting to effect their purpose, either by violence, or by demonstration of force or numbers, or by a species of intimidation, impediment, or obstruction, calculated to effect their object.

He went on to say:

It is not necessary that the purpose or object of the mob should have been previously concerted, or that they should be brought together and congregated with the view previously formed of effecting the object subsequently attempted. It is enough, that after they have been so assembled and brought together, finding their numbers, and ascertaining a common feeling, they then act in concert, and take up and resolve to effect common purpose. There must, however, be a common purpose and object, for which they are combined and acting in concert, after they are congregated and operating as such throughout the acts alleged to be acts of mobbing. That object or purpose must be unlawful.

These passages were approved by the High Court, as an accurate statement of the law, in Hancock and others v HM Advocate 1981 SCCR 32.

== Compensation for riot damage ==
See section 10 of the Riotous Assemblies (Scotland) Act 1822 and section 235 of the Merchant Shipping Act 1995.
