= Matt Stephens (author) =

Matt Stephens (born 1971) is an author and software process expert based in London, UK. In January 2010 he founded independent book publisher Fingerpress UK Ltd, and in November 2014 he founded the Virtual Reality book discovery site Inkflash.

He is known for having spoken out against what he regards as popular (or populist) software development fashions, most notably Extreme Programming, Enterprise JavaBeans (EJB) and the Ruby programming language. He has co-authored four books on software development: Design Driven Testing: Test Smarter, Not Harder, Use Case Driven Object Modeling with UML: Theory and Practice, Agile Development with ICONIX Process, and Extreme Programming Refactored: The Case Against XP. He is also a columnist for The Register, a UK-based IT news website where he writes a monthly "Agile Iconoclast" column on software design and programming, and has written for Dr Dobb's Journal, Software Development Magazine, Application Development Trends and other journals and websites.

Stephens' first book, Extreme Programming Refactored, has proved to be controversial as it satirizes the popular Extreme Programming (XP) agile methodology. The book triggered a lengthy debate in articles, internet newsgroups, and web-site chat areas. The core argument of the book is that XP is fragile rather than agile, as its practices are interdependent but that few practical organizations are willing/able to adopt all the practices; therefore the entire process fails. On the book's first page he points out that he is not "anti-agile", rather that the XP process is a fragile implementation of the values described in the Agile Manifesto.

In Use Case Driven Object Modeling with UML, Stephens outlines an extension to the ICONIX object modeling process which he and co-author Doug Rosenberg termed Design Driven Testing (DDT), a deliberate reversal of Test Driven Development (TDD), a core tenet of XP. DDT provides a method of creating unit tests and customer acceptance tests that are driven from the design and behavioral requirements (use cases). DDT and the ICONIX modeling process have been adopted in a variety of large-scale software projects e.g. the image processing software in the Large Synoptic Survey Telescope (LSST).

In Design Driven Testing, Stephens compares DDT with TDD, and applies DDT on a real project run by ESRI Systems, to create a GIS mapping system for travel website VResorts.com.
