= Stand-up meeting =

Meeting at which attendees remain standing

A stand-up meeting (STUM, SUM, DSUM) is a meeting in which attendees typically participate while standing, usually at around 10 am. The discomfort of standing for long periods is intended to keep the meetings short.

== Notable examples ==
By tradition, the Privy Council of the United Kingdom meets standing.

== Software development ==
According to the PMBOK (7th edition) by the Project Management Institute (PMI), daily stand-up is a "brief, daily collaboration meeting in which the team review progress from the previous day, declares intentions for the current day, and highlights any obstacles encountered or anticipated."

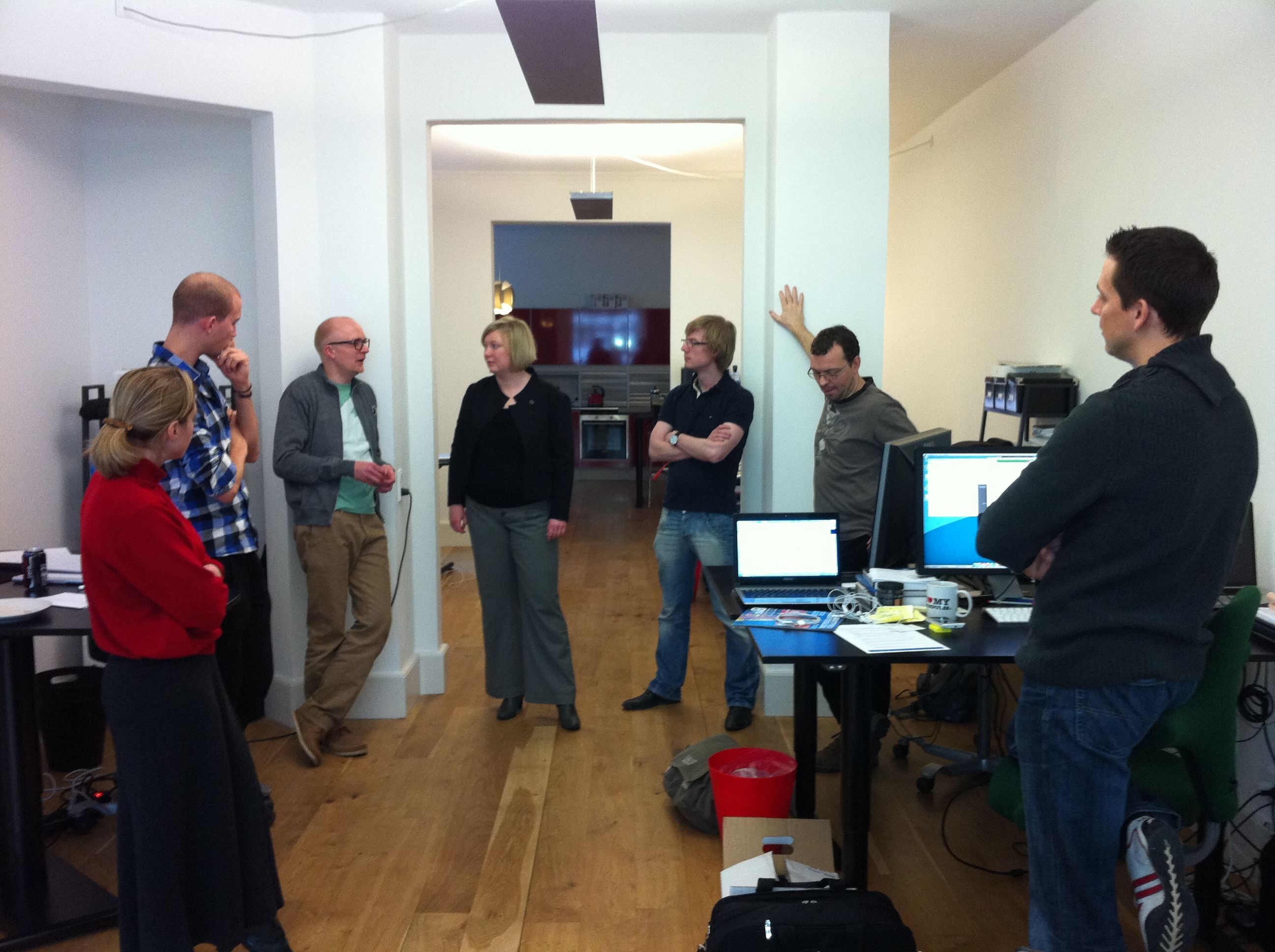
A stand-up meeting

Some software development processes envision daily team meetings to make commitments to team members. The daily commitments allow participants to learn of potential challenges and to coordinate efforts to resolve difficult or time-consuming issues. The stand-up has particular value in agile software development processes, such as scrum or Kanban, but can be used as part of any software development process.

The meeting should usually occur at the same time and place every working day. All team members are encouraged to attend, but meetings are not postponed if some team members are absent. One of the crucial features is that the meeting is a communication opportunity among team members and not a status update to management or stakeholders. Although it is sometimes referred to as a type of status meeting, the structure of the meeting is meant to promote follow-up conversation, and to identify issues before they become too problematic. The practice also promotes closer working relationships in its frequency, need for follow-up conversations and short structure, which in turn result in a higher rate of knowledge transfer – a much more active intention than the typical status meeting. Team members take turns speaking, sometimes passing along a token to indicate the current person allowed to speak. Each member talks about progress since the last stand-up, the anticipated work until the next stand-up and any impediments, taking the opportunity to ask for help or collaborate.

Team members may sometimes ask for short clarifications and make brief statements, such as "Let's talk about this more after the meeting", but the stand-up usually does not include full discussions.

The meetings are usually timeboxed to between 5 and 15 minutes, and occur with participants standing up to remind people to keep the meeting short and to-the-point. The stand-up meeting is sometimes also referred to as the "stand-up" when doing extreme programming, "morning rollcall" or "daily scrum" when following the scrum framework.

=== In Scrum ===
Scrum has daily meetings (the daily scrum) for the team to reflect and assess progress towards the sprint goal. This meeting is intended to be brief, less than 15 minutes, so any in-depth discussions about impediments are deferred until after the event is complete. As some teams conduct their meetings standing up, they may refer to this meeting as the "daily stand-up".

An older Scrum Guide (2017) suggested team members briefly, for a maximum of one minute per member, address three questions as input to this planning:

1. What did I do yesterday that helped the development team meet the sprint goal?
2. What will I do today to help the development team meet the sprint goal?
3. Do I see any impediment that prevents me or the development team from meeting the sprint goal?

These questions were removed from the 2020 Scrum Guide.

Kanban-style daily stand-ups focus more on:

1. What obstacles are impeding my progress?
2. (looking at the board from right to left) What has progressed?

== See also ==
- Lean software development
- Five Ws
