= Ron Jeffries =

American computer scientist

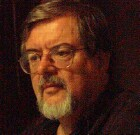
- Jeffries in 2006
- Born: December 26, 1939 (age 86); Washington D.C., United States
- Occupation: Computer Scientist / Engineer

Ron Jeffries (born December 26, 1939) is one of the three founders of the Extreme Programming (XP) software development methodology circa 1996, along with Kent Beck and Ward Cunningham. He was from 1996, an XP coach on the Chrysler Comprehensive Compensation System project, which was where XP was invented. He is an author of Extreme Programming Installed, the second book published about XP. He has also written Extreme Programming Adventures in C#. He is one of the 17 original signatories of the Agile Manifesto.In 2018, Jeffries advocated for abandoning what he termed “Dark Agile,” encouraging developers to return to the original values and mindset of Agile.

== Background ==
In 1968 he joined the University of Michigan’s MERIT Computer Network staff as a systems programmer, helping port the early Michigan Terminal System (MTS) operating system to IBM 360/67 hardware.

A Quote

My teams and I have implemented software products earning over half a billion dollars in revenue, including commercial software in assembler, FORTRAN, Pascal, C, C++, and Smalltalk. (I wonder why I didn't get any of the money.) I've also done substantial non-commercial development in LISP, Forth, and probably half a dozen other languages. I've implemented commercial operating systems, compilers, relational and set-theoretic database systems, and a wide range of applications. I have degrees in Mathematics and in Computer and Communication Science. All this experience comes at a price: I absolutely never get carded when I order a glass of beer. I was fortunate enough to get involved with Extreme Programming at the beginning, and I've been doing nothing but helping people with it ever since. Looking back over all my successful (and not so successful) projects, I'd apply XP techniques to all of them were I to do them over.

— Ron Jeffries

== Books ==
- Ron E. Jeffries; Ann Anderson; Chet Hendrickson (October 2000). Extreme Programming Installed. Addison-Wesley. ISBN 978-0-201-70842-4.
- Ron Jeffries (February 2004). Extreme Programming Adventures in C#. Microsoft Press. ISBN 978-0-7356-1949-4.
- Ron Jeffries (February 2015). The Nature of Software Development: Keep It Simple, Make It Valuable, Build It Piece by Piece. Pragmatic Bookshelf publishing. ISBN 978-1-94122-237-9.

== Articles ==
- Ken Auer; Ron Jeffries; Jeff Canna; Glen B. Alleman; Lisa Crispin; Janet Gregory (2002). "Are Testers eXtinct? How Can Testers Contribute to XP Teams?". Extreme Programming and Agile Methods — XP/Agile Universe 2002. Lecture Notes in Computer Science. Vol. 2418. Springer-Verlag. p. 287. doi:10.1007/3-540-45672-4_50. ISBN 978-3-540-44024-6.
