= Solidarity Trade Union of Myanmar =

Trade union in Myanmar

STUM
- Solidarity Trade Union of Myanmar
- Founded: 2016
- Location: Myanmar
- Key people: Myo Myo Aye
- Website: www.facebook.com/STUMMyanmar

The Solidarity Trade Union of Myanmar (STUM) is a trade union in Myanmar.

== History ==
STUM was established in 2016 by female workers dissatisfied with the male domination of the Myanmar Trade Union Federation, one of several such cases in Myanmar at the time.

Following the 2021 Myanmar coup d'état, STUM took part in the ensuing protests. On April 15, the military government arrested STUM leader Myo Myo Aye, together with at least 35 other opposition figures on that day, leading to international condemnation. She was released again on October 25.
