= Customer representative =

A customer representative is an individual who has authority to represent a community that intends to purchase a product. The term is most often applied to a representative of a company, or proxy, who works closely with a producer or developer to clarify specifications for a product or service. The term is used in software engineering; especially in development methodology Extreme Programming and Agile software development.

== See also ==
- Representative
- Product Owner
