= William Opdyke =

American computer scientist and enterprise architect

- Born: c. 1958 (age 67–68)

Academic background
- Education: Drexel University (BS); University of Wisconsin–Madison (MS); University of Illinois at Urbana–Champaign (PhD)
- Thesis: Refactoring Object-Oriented Frameworks
- Doctoral advisor: Ralph Johnson

Academic work
- Discipline: Computer science
- Sub-discipline: Code refactoring Enterprise software Banking software
- Institutions: AT&T Bell Laboratories; North Central College; Motorola; JPMorgan Chase

William F. "Bill" Opdyke (born c. 1958) is an American computer scientist and enterprise architect at JPMorgan Chase, known for his early work on code refactoring.

== Education ==
Opdyke received a B.S. from Drexel University in 1979, an M.S. from University of Wisconsin–Madison in 1982, and his Ph.D. from the University of Illinois at Urbana–Champaign in 1992 under the supervision of Ralph Johnson. His Ph.D. thesis, Refactoring Object-Oriented Frameworks, was the first in-depth study of code refactoring as a software engineering technique.

== Career ==
Opdyke started his career at AT&T Bell Laboratories in 1981, where he worked as researcher until 2001. From 2001 to 2006 he was associate professor in computer science at North Central College in Naperville, Illinois, and for Motorola in Schaumburg, Illinois. Since 2009, he has worked as an enterprise architect in the mobile and web retail banking area, and trainer at the Technical Leadership Development program.

== Selected publications ==
- Opdyke, William F. Refactoring Object-Oriented Frameworks. Diss. University of Illinois at Urbana-Champaign, 1992.
- Fowler, M., Beck, K., Brant, J., Opdyke, W., & Roberts, D. (1999). Refactoring: Improving the Design of Existing Programs.
- Opdyke, William F., and Ralph E. Johnson. "Creating abstract superclasses by refactoring." Proceedings of the 1993 ACM conference on Computer science. ACM, 1993.
- Johnson, Ralph E., and William F. Opdyke. "Refactoring and aggregation." Object Technologies for Advanced Software. Springer Berlin Heidelberg, 1993. 264-278.
- Foote, Brian, and William F. Opdyke. "Lifecycle and refactoring patterns that support evolution and reuse." Pattern languages of program design 1 (1995).
