= Mike Beedle =

American software engineer

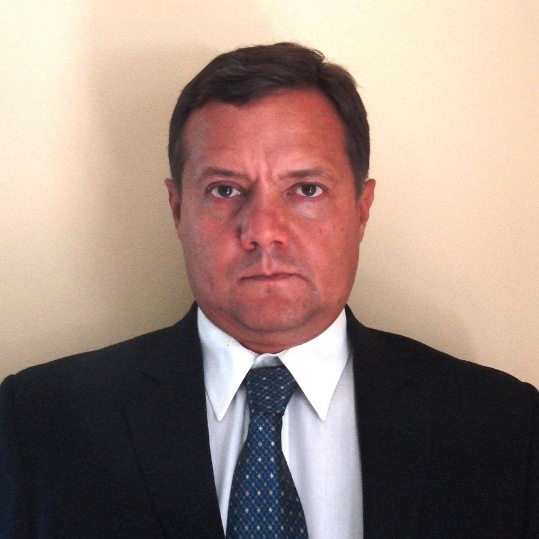
- Born: 11 October 1962
- Died: March 23, 2018 (aged 55)
- Known for: Co-author of Agile Manifesto

Miguel "Mike" Beedle was an American software engineer and theoretical physicist who was a co-author of the Agile Manifesto.

He was the co-author of the first book and earliest papers on Scrum. Later, he coined the term "Enterprise Scrum," developed his ideas into a canvas-based approach, and promoted Enterprise Scrum as a framework for scaling the practices and benefits of Scrum across organizations.

== Agile Manifesto ==
In 2001, Beedle was one of the seventeen people who created and signed the Manifesto for Agile Software Development. He was invited by Martin Fowler and Robert C. Martin because of his involvement in the early adoption of Scrum and the organizational pattern community. Beedle was one of the first to follow in implementing Scrum after Jeff Sutherland and Ken Schwaber and collaborated on writing the Scrum Patterns article, which was the second published paper on Scrum.

The Agile Uprising podcast published an interview with Beedle from Snowbird ski resort, regarding his collaboration on the creation of the Agile Manifesto. Beedle recalled that he had proposed the term "agile," which ultimately filtered through a process of selection with the other signatories:

"I can tell you I came up with that word (Agile) because I was familiar with the book Agile Competitors and Virtual Organizations. We had proposed Adaptive, Essential, lean, and Lightweight. We did not want to use Adaptive because Jim Highsmith had given this to one of his works. Essential sounded overly proud. Lean had already been taken. Nobody wanted to be a lightweight. We did this late in the second day, and it took only a few minutes to decide on this."

== Scrum Early Adopter ==
Beedle was an early adopter of Scrum, implementing it within his own companies and providing guidance to other organizations on its adoption. In 2001, he co-authored the book "Agile Software Development with Scrum" with Ken Schwaber.

The main idea behind Scrum was to create a team that would resemble artificial life, a robot, or an adaptive system that would adapt and learn through "social intelligence." Beedle held a PhD in Physics and his thesis focused on chaotic and non-linear systems. Joining these two concepts was what allowed Ken Schwaber, Jeff Sutherland, and Mike Beedle to akin Scrum to "creating a team at the edge of chaos". Both directions pointed to the same end game: creating a hyper-productive team that worked as an adaptive system at the edge of chaos through structure.

== Works ==
- SCRUM: An extension pattern language for hype productive software development (the second published paper on Scrum).
- Schwaber, Ken (February 1, 2004). Agile Project Management with Scrum. Microsoft Press. ISBN 978-0-7356-1993-7.
- Schwaber, Ken; Beedle, Mike (February 18, 2002). Agile Software Development with Scrum. Prentice Hall. ISBN 978-0-13-067634-4.

== Death ==
Beedle was killed in Chicago in 2018 in an apparent robbery.

After his death, Scrum creator Jeff Sutherland posted, "The Scrum and Agile community lost a giant this weekend. Mike Beedle was a close friend and inspiration to many of us." The Scrum Alliance said, "Mike and his companies have introduced Scrum, Enterprise Scrum and Business Agility, to tens of thousands of people and thousands of companies, providing training, consulting, mentoring, and coaching. He is the creator of the Enterprise Scrum framework and was the first CEO to manage an entire company in an Agile way using Enterprise Scrum. He was a keynote speaker at countless Agile and Scrum conferences world-wide."
