= Hirotaka Takeuchi =

Japanese business academic

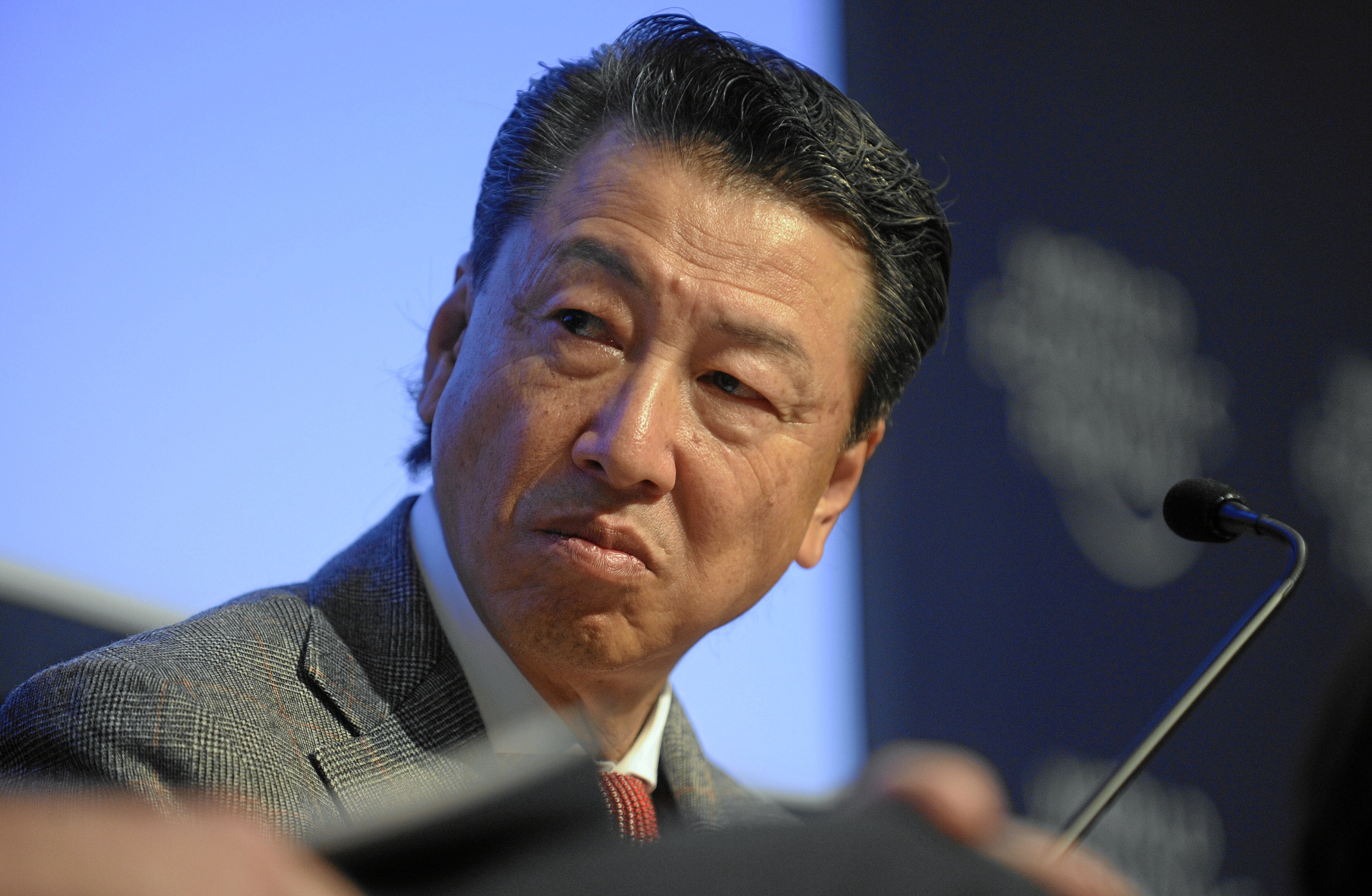
- At the 2009 World Economic Forum, Davos
- Born: 16 October 1946 (age 80)
- Education: International Christian University; University of California, Berkeley
- Known for: Influencing business practices worldwide

Hirotaka Takeuchi (竹内 弘高, Takeuchi Hirotaka) is a professor of management practice in the Strategy Unit at Harvard Business School. He co-authored The New New Product Development Game which influenced the development of the Scrum framework.

== Biography ==
Takeuchi was born in 1946 and gained a B.A. from International Christian University in Tokyo, and an M.B.A. and Ph.D. from the University of California, Berkeley. His early non-academic career included work at McCann-Erickson in Tokyo and San Francisco and at McKinsey & Company in Tokyo.

From 1976 to 1983 Takeuchi had his first faculty position at Harvard Business School, as an assistant professor in the Marketing Unit. He moved to Hitotsubashi University in Tokyo in 1983, becoming a professor in 1987. In another spell at Harvard Business School from 1995 to 1996, Takeuchi served as a visiting professor in the Advanced Management Program.

In 1998 Takeuchi became the founding dean of Hitotsubashi University's business school, the Graduate School of International Corporate Strategy. 2010 saw Takeuchi appointed to the position of Professor Emeritus at that university and in the same year he was additionally appointed as a professor at Harvard Business School.

Takeuchi has written or co-authored numerous articles for the Harvard Business Review. He has served on the planning board of the World Economic Forum and is an external director at Mitsui & Co. and an outside director at Daiwa Securities Group Inc.

== The New New Product Development Game ==
Takeuchi collaborated on a number of articles with Ikujiro Nonaka (野中 郁次郎), a colleague at Hitotsubashi University, including the 1986 Harvard Business Review article The New New Product Development Game, in which they emphasized speed and flexibility for new product development.

The article looked at practices in a number of successful manufacturing companies such as Fuji-Xerox, Honda, 3M and Toyota. The authors drew attention to the practice in those companies of having an overlapping development process ('like Sashimi'), rather than the older sequential approach. They likened it to the game of Rugby, where a team 'tries to go the distance as a unit, passing the ball back and forth' and where a team may employ different tactics to make the best use of its talents.

The authors found that teams in the most successful companies they examined exhibited the following conditions:

- Autonomy - being self-organising and empowered to make decisions over how to do the work
- Cross-fertilization - having within the teams all the skills needed to complete the task
- Self-Transcendence - elevating their goals and pushing beyond the normally accepted limit; challenging the status quo

The article attracted attention when it was published but its significance for software development was born seven years later when a team at Easel Corporation led by Jeff Sutherland alighted on the article and spotted the opportunity it offered to achieve their goal of delivering software on schedule and under budget.

Sutherland went on to develop the concept in conjunction with Ken Schwaber as the Scrum framework, an agile software development technique now used across the globe.

== The Nonaka-Takeuchi model of knowledge creation and practice ==
Takeuchi's colleague Ikujiro Nonaka wrote an article The Knowledge-Creating Company in the Harvard Business Review, 1991. It explored two types of knowledge, namely tacit knowledge which is that learned by experience and communicated indirectly, and explicit knowledge, which is that recorded in documentation, manuals and procedures. Nonaka wrote that Japanese companies viewed knowledge as primarily tacit but had mastered converting tacit to explicit and back again (the 'spiral of knowledge'). In 1995 Nonaka and Takeuchi co-authored a book which expanded on the subject and brought it to a wider audience: The Knowledge-Creating Company : How Japanese Companies Create the Dynamics of Innovation. The authors described the methods used in successful Japanese companies to create new knowledge and use it to produce successful products. They called this 'organizational knowledge creation' – an ability to 'create new knowledge, disseminate it throughout the organization and embody it in products, services and systems'.

The book published by Oxford University Press was named as Best Book of the Year in Business and Management, 1996 by the Association of American Publishers.

== Selected bibliography ==
- Takeuchi, Hirotaka; Ikujiro, Nonaka (1995), The knowledge creating company: how Japanese companies create the dynamics of innovation, New York: Oxford University Press, p. 284, ISBN 978-0195092691
- Porter, Michael E.; Takeuchi, Hirotaka; Sakakibara, Mariko (2000), Can Japan Compete?, Palgrave Macmillan, ISBN 978-0333786581
- Takeuchi, Hirotaka (2004), Hitotsubashi on Knowledge Management, Wiley, ISBN 978-0470820742
- Takeuchi, Hirotaka; Shimizu, Norihiko; Osono, Emi (2008), Extreme Toyota: Radical Contradictions That Drive Success at the World's Best Manufacturer, John Wiley & Sons Ltd
- Takeuchi, Hirotaka; Kase, Kimeo; von Krogh, Georg; Cantón, César González (2013), Towards Organizational Knowledge: The Pioneering Work of Ikujiro Nonaka, Palgrave Macmillan, ISBN 978-1137024954

== See also ==
- SECI model of knowledge dimensions
