= Scrumedge =

ScrumEdge
- Initial release: March 23, 2009
- Written in: PHP JavaScript
- Operating system: Server-based Web application
- Available in: English
- Type: Agile Project Management
- License: Proprietary, free for small teams (less than 5 users)

ScrumEdge is a collaborative web-based scrum tool that allows agile development teams, ScrumMasters, and stakeholders to manage the Scrum lifecycle at the product and sprint levels.

ScrumEdge programmed in PHP and is distributed under the Apache Software License 2.0. It supports Scrum-Teams, ScrumMasters and Product Owners in running and coordinating agile software development projects.

== Framework ==
Scrum is an agile framework for completing complex projects. Scrum originally was formalized for software development projects, but works well for any complex, innovative scope of work. The possibilities are endless. The Scrum framework is deceptively simple.

== History ==
ScrumEdge was founded in 2008 and on April 23, 2009, ScrumEdge launched its project planning and management tool for scrum teams. ScrumEdge is based out of Virginia, USA.

== Features ==
ScrumEdge, while following the manifesto for agile software development, enables agile development teams to share information about their projects and manage their project deliverables.

ScrumEdge allows users to manage their product backlogs, report their scrum related issues and report time against their sprint backlogs. ScrumEdge also has a project level dashboard that all users see when they sign in. This page displays all projects users are assigned to along with a basic snapshot of the number of sprints, stories and users that are assigned to each project. Progress bars allow users to see project progress at a glance. Story and Task Effort level reports allow ScrumMasters and Product Owners to follow their sprints in more detail. ScrumEdge also generates burndown charts, budget charts and the scrum team's burn rate charts.

ScrumEdge is intended to support various flavors of Agile like XP, Scrum, Agile Hybrid. Though primarily a project management tool, it also provides issue tracking, project reporting and program management.
