= Deployment =

Deployment may refer to:

- Military deployment, the movement of armed forces and their logistical support
- Software deployment, all of the activities that make a software system available for use
- System deployment, transforming a mechanical, electrical, or computer system from a packaged to an operational state
