= Jeff Sutherland =

American computer scientist

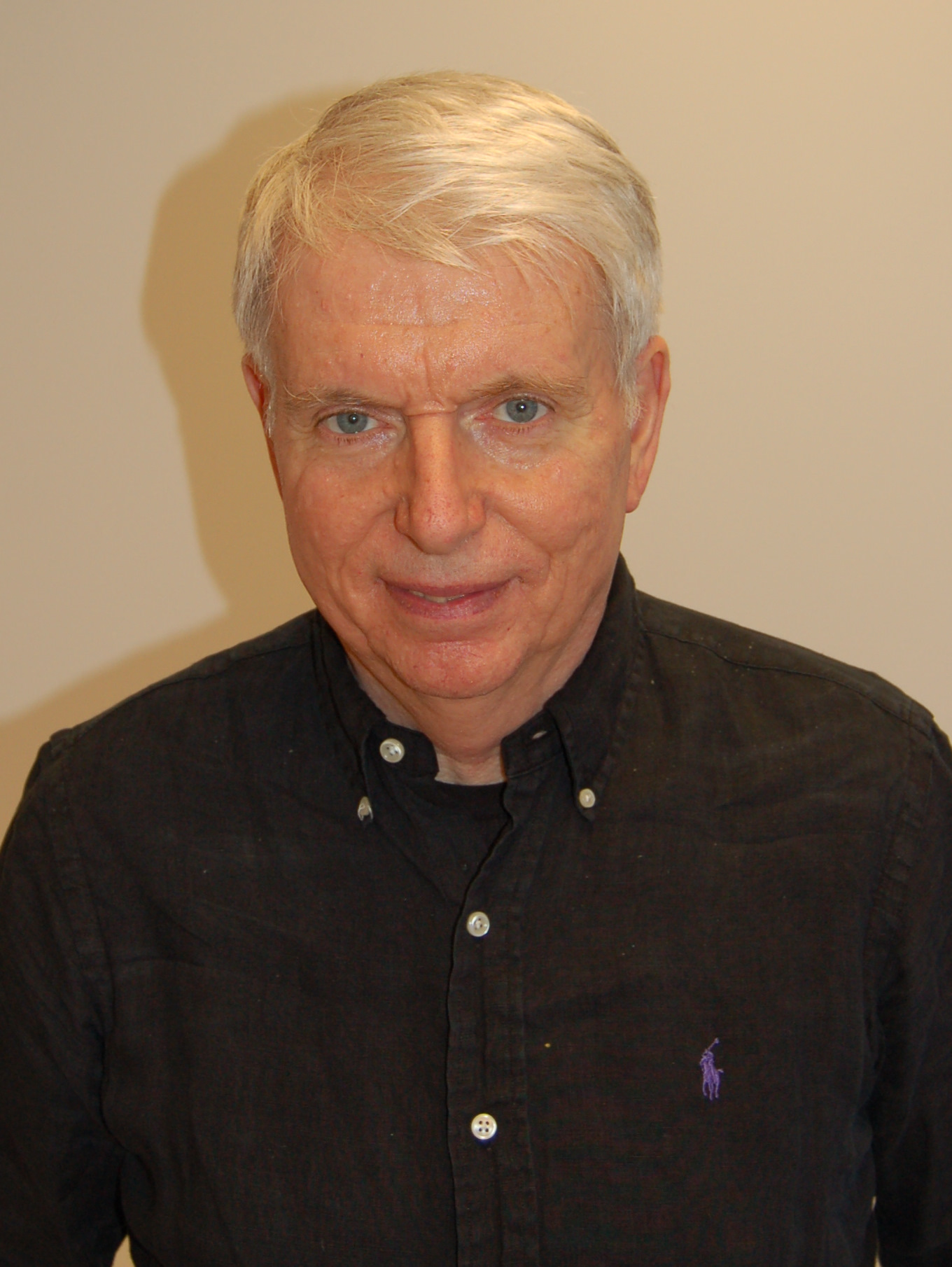
- Born: June 20, 1941 (age 85)
- Education: United States Military Academy (B.S.); Stanford University (M.S.); University of Colorado School of Medicine (PhD)
- Occupation: Project manager
- Military Career
- Allegiance: United States
- Branch: United States Air Force
- Rank: Captain
- Conflicts: Vietnam War
- Known for: Helping create the Scrum method

Jeff Sutherland (born June 20, 1941) is one of the creators of Scrum, a framework for product management. Together with Ken Schwaber, he presented Scrum at OOPSLA'95. Sutherland contributed to the creation of the Agile Manifesto in 2001. Along with Ken Schwaber, he wrote and maintains The Scrum Guide, which contains the official definition of the framework.

== Early career ==
Sutherland graduated from North Attleborough High School in 1958. He then graduated from the United States Military Academy at West Point, New York in 1964. In 1967 he deployed with the United States Air Force to Udorn Royal Thai Air Force Base to fly reconnaissance flights in a RF-4C Phantom, including missions in the Vietnam War.

After returning from the Vietnam war, Sutherland earned a master's degree in statistics from Stanford University. He then became a professor of mathematics at the United States Air Force Academy. Sutherland earned a doctorate in biometrics at the University of Colorado School of Medicine.

While in the air force, he became a captain.

== Project management career ==
Jointly with Yosi Amram, Sutherland developed NewsPage at Individual.com, one of the first publishers of news on the internet. The news engine used a lexical parsing system.

Sutherland has said "Systems development process is an unpredictable and complicated process that can only roughly be described as an overall progression".

The Scrum process was developed by Sutherland, John Scumniotales and Jeff McKenna while at Easel Corporation and influenced by agile software development. The principle was based on a 1986 article by Hirotaka Takeuchi and Ikujiro Nonaka in the Harvard Business Review, and incorporates practices from a draft study published in Dr. Dobb's Journal. It involves 30-day cycles of plan, build and monitor sprints. The name Scrum was chosen in reference to the rugby scrummage, as the system involves "a cross-functional team" who "huddle together to create a prioritized list". Scrum has been used by several major corporations. Sutherland has claimed that distributed teams coached to use the system can make large productivity increases against the industry average.

=== Scrum Framework ===
Scrum involves a cross-functional team creating a list to work on. The team consists of three specific roles, the Product Owner, the Developers and the Scrum Master. The team then works through three phases: a pre-sprint planning, the sprint and then a post-sprint meeting. The group has daily meetings and keeps a Product Backlog. In contributing to the book The Secrets of Happy Families, Sutherland modified the Agile approach to family interactions.

Sutherland has been quoted as saying the three distinguishing factors between Scrum teams and normal teams are self-management, continuity of team membership, and dedication to a single project. Clarification of user needs is an essential component. Sutherland said no coding should occur while user needs were in doubt, and is quoted as saying "It is better for the developers to be surfing than writing code that won't be needed". Sutherland has also been quoted as saying that Scrum should run with software architecture.

Sutherland is the founder and principal consultant at Scrum, Inc in Boston, Massachusetts, currently led by his son, JJ Sutherland as the CEO. Additionally, he was appointed a senior advisor to OpenView Venture Partners 2007 for a short period in that year.

== Bibliography ==
=== Books ===
- Sutherland, Jeff; Schwaber, Ken (May 1, 2012). Software in 30 Days: How Agile Managers Beat the Odds, Delight Their Customers, and Leave Competitors in the Dust (1st ed.). Wiley. p. 216. ISBN 978-1118206669.
- Sutherland, Jeff; Sutherland, J.J. (September 30, 2014). Scrum: The Art of Doing Twice the Work in Half the Time (1st ed.). Currency. p. 256. ISBN 9780385346450.
- Sutherland, Jeff; Coplien, James (August 2019). A Scrum Book: The Spirit of the Game (1st ed.). Pragmatic Programmers. p. 572. ISBN 978-1118206669.
- Sutherland, Jeff (November 27, 2024). First Principles in Scrum: Teams That Finish Early Accelerate Faster (1st ed.). Leanpub.com. p. 483.

=== Selected articles ===
- Schwaber, Ken; Sutherland, Jeff; Patel, D.; Casanave, C. (1997). "SCRUM Development Process" (PDF). Business Object Design and Implementation. pp. 117–134. doi:10.1007/978-1-4471-0947-1_11. ISBN 978-3-540-76096-2.
- Rigby, Darrell; Sutherland, Jeff (May 2018). "Agile at Scale". Harvard Business Review.
- Rigby, Darrell; Sutherland, Jeff; Takeuchi, Hirotaka (April 2016). "The Secret History of Agile Innovation". Harvard Business Review.
- Rigby, Darrell; Sutherland, Jeff; Takeuchi, Hirotaka (May 2016). "Embracing Agile". Harvard Business Review.
