= SKS process =

The SKS process is a framework of Stop/Keep-doing/Start that is used to collect or categorize feedback.

You can ask customers or colleagues:

- What should I stop doing?
- What should I keep doing?
- What should I start doing?

Traffic Light

Alternatively, you can develop conclusions and present them using a traffic light icon as the activities that an organization should stop (red light), continue (yellow light), or start (green light).

This approach is also used in agile development, where it is known as Start/Stop/Continue.
