= PAL-E =

PAL-E may refer to:

- Phase Alternating Line PAL
- Professional Agile Leadership Essentials
