= Account stacking =

Account stacking is a broadcast industry term, which refers to the deployment of subscription Direct To Home (DTH) satellite receiving equipment at multiple geographical locations under a single customer account. It is often referred to as second address service, subscription sharing, or account splitting.

Account stacking is sometimes confused with satellite TV hacking and piracy, however account stacking utilizes receiving apparatus which is legal in every material respect.

A contentious issue exists since the receiving equipment is easily relocated and most DTH satellite providers prefer to charge a subscription fee on a per dwelling basis, much like cable TV, and not on a per-receiver or per-customer basis.

CRTC - Broadcasting Distribution Regulations

In Canada, DTH satellite providers are licensed by the CRTC (Canadian Radio-television and Telecommunications Commission) as Broadcast Distribution Undertakings, or BDU's for short. The regulations under which they are authorized to provide service are found in the CRTC's Broadcasting Distribution Regulations.

1. Under the regulations a "customer" means a person who is liable for payment for programming services that are distributed by a licensee and that are received directly or indirectly by one or more subscribers.

2. A "subscriber" is a household of one or more persons, whether occupying a single-unit dwelling or a unit in a multiple-unit dwelling, to which service is provided directly or indirectly by a licensee.

3. A significant distinction exists between cable TV providers and DTH providers. The 'utility distribution model' used for cable TV does not readily apply to DTH undertakings. Cable TV is provided on a 'per dwelling' basis since it a closed-circuit wire-line service whereas DTH satellite is provided on a 'per customer' basis since the radio waves used for distribution cover a continent-wide area.

4. The CRTC broadcast distribution regulations seem to favor the 'per customer' model and sanction "account stacking".

5. The CRTC has a policy in place to accommodate the marketing and billing practice of “account stacking” under its Broadcast Distribution Regulations. This is discussed in Broadcast Public Notices 2006-133 and 2006–134, which provides that ‘discretionary service' channel providers are to be paid a wholesale affiliation fee on a ‘per dwelling’ basis. Basic service channel providers do not receive affiliation fees and so are not affected by this "Account Stacking" policy.

Radiocommunication Act (Canada)

9. (1) No person shall (c) decode an encrypted subscription programming signal or encrypted network feed otherwise than under and in accordance with an authorization from the lawful distributor of the signal or feed.

10. (1) Every person who (b) without lawful excuse, manufactures, imports, distributes, leases, offers for sale, sells, installs, modifies, operates or possesses any equipment or device, or any component thereof, under circumstances that give rise to a reasonable inference that the equipment, device or component has been used, or is or was intended to be used, for the purpose of contravening section 9.

Comment:

Section 10(1)(b) of the Radiocommunication Act is not there to convict persons who have obtained the statutory authorization to decode an encrypted subscription-programming signal pursuant to Section 9(1)(c).

Statutory authorization exists when the lawful distributor makes its signal available on payment of a subscription fee or other charge.
