= Rolling-wave planning =

Rolling-wave planning is the process of project planning in waves as the project proceeds and later details become clearer; similar to the techniques used in agile software development approaches like Scrum.

Work to be done in the near term is based on high-level assumptions; also, high-level milestones are set. As the project progresses, the risks, assumptions, and milestones originally identified become more defined and reliable. One would use rolling-wave planning in an instance where there is an extremely tight schedule or timeline to adhere to, as more thorough planning would place the schedule into an unacceptable negative schedule variance.

The concepts of rolling-wave planning and progressive elaboration are techniques covered in the Project Management Body of Knowledge.
