= Agile leadership =

Leadership philosophy

Rooted in agile software development and initially referred to leading self-organizing development teams, the concept of agile leadership is now used to more generally denote an approach to people and team leadership that is focused on boosting adaptiveness in highly dynamic and complex business environments.

== History ==
There are many perspectives on the origins of agile leadership, some of which align with the advent of the Agile Software Development manifesto. With the rise of agile software development, organizations discovered the need for a new leadership approach. The relentless advancements of technology have introduced an evergrowing amount of VUCA (volatility, uncertainty, complexity and ambiguity). As complexity grows, organizations need to be able to respond quickly with the ability to make decisions in ambiguous environments with increasing uncertainties. Traditional management is often seen as too slow in organizations engaged in these markets. Like transformational leadership, agile leadership practices promote enabling individuals and teams through the mandate and freedom to make their own decisions. Through realignment of accountability and decision-making, teams are offered the ability to respond quicker to changes and complexity. This technology-driven evolution of leadership approaches looks at the leader for supporting a managerial need for creating the right context and environment for self-managing teams (see workers' self-management).

The framework for business agility has also created a set of Agile Leadership principles. The principles of Agile leadership are grounded in the Agile mindset, a set of values and beliefs outlined in the Agile Manifesto that prioritize collaboration, adaptability, and continuous delivery of value.

In today's technology-focused culture, Agile leadership provides autonomy to employees while encouraging growth and experimentation to address the unknown needs of the future. By enabling individuals and teams to create clarity on the objectives or desired outcomes and discover the best ways to achieve them, Agile Leadership looks to address the near-constant complexity and change intrinsic to organizations. Building from the origins of the Agile Software Development Manifesto, agile leadership practices are customer-centric and focus on market needs.

== Leading self-organizing teams ==
For some authors, the essence of agile leadership is creating the right environment for self-managing teams. Peter Koning (2020), for example, defines four corresponding areas of action:

1. Co-create the goals – instead of giving instructions, rather make sure that the goals are clear. So teams know what to achieve, and if their actions are bringing them any closer to their goal.
2. Facilitate ownership – create an environment in which agile teams can grow and thrive. Teams can't be forced to take Ownership, leaders can only create those circumstances in which teams take ownership. This is a balancing between stepping in and letting go. Finding the sweetspot where teams have the right amount of freedom aligned with their level of maturity.
3. Learn faster – being fit and ready for the future is not about being the best, it's about learning faster. Self-managing teams need to get fast feedback on their actions and their decisions, preferably from users and customers. It is the leader's role to promote learning from experiments and failures.
4. Design the culture – The agile leader has to envision, design and improve the culture of the organisation.

== 'Enabler - disruptor' model of agile leadership ==
Favoring a more general approach and highlighting the leadership demands linked to digitization, Simon Hayward (2018) describes agile leadership as simultaneously enabling and disrupting teams and the organization (a paradox, he refers to as the agile leadership paradox):

Agile leader as 'enabler'

1. Learning agility
2. Clarity of direction
3. Empathy and trust
4. Empowering
5. Working together

Agile leader as 'disruptor'

1. Thoughtfully decisive
2. Digitally literate
3. Questioning the status quo
4. Creating new ways of thinking
5. Close to customer trends

== 'Align - empower' model of agile leadership ==
This framework by Marc Solga (2021) strives to integrate the various ideas that have been floating around the concept of agile leadership. It defines the purpose of agile leadership as enabling people and teams to meet performance expectations and customer demands in business/task environments that are charged with VUCA (volatility, uncertainty, complexity, and ambiguity) and where process knowledge (knowing how to produce desired results) is weak.

To achieve this, an agile leader needs to simultaneously foster divergence and convergence. The former involves enabling and exploiting a multitude and diversity of options and possibilities to boost adaptiveness, that is to say, promote responsiveness, flexibility, and speed to effectively deal with dynamic change and disruptive challenges (the 'empower' component). The latter involves promoting alignment with overarching goals and standards as well as across teams (the 'align' component).

Solga (2021) defines three 'alignment' practices and three 'empowerment' practices:

'Alignment' practices (ensuring convergence):

1. Motivate: Giving esteem, inspiration, and care to inspire emotional engagement and, with it, 'emotional alignment'
2. Infuse: Creating value orientation and commitment to the purpose and values of the organization ('normative alignment')
3. Focus: Creating a shared understanding of goals and priorities, roles, processes, and crucial boundary conditions within teams and across the organization ('task alignment')

'Empowerment' practices (enabling and exploiting divergence):

1. Facilitate: Providing resources, removing obstacles, enabling self-organization, and giving decision-making discretion ('structural empowerment')
2. Coach: Enabling people and teams to (co-) operate effectively in 'structurally empowered' task environments ('competency-focused empowerment')
3. Innovate: Enabling an explorative or iterative approach to problem solving and task delivery (i.e., spiraling between experimentation and reflection, prototyping and feedback); also, promoting a constructive approach to handling tension (understanding frictions and conflicts as 'drivers of development'); since all this is about expanding and testing options to reach improvements and novel solutions, its focus is on 'innovation empowerment'.

== See also ==
- Agility
- VUCA
- Digitization
- Leadership
