= Agile architecture =

Agile architecture means how enterprise architects, system architects and software architects apply architectural practice in agile software development. A number of commentators have identified a tension between traditional software architecture and agile methods along the axis of adaptation (leaving architectural decisions until the last possible moment) versus anticipation (planning in advance) (Kruchten, 2010 ).

Waterman, Nobel, and Allan (2015) explored the tensions between spending too little time designing an up-front architecture, increasing risk, and spending too much time, negatively impacting of the delivery of value to the customer. They identify six forces that can affect agile architecture: Requirements instability, technical risk, early value, team culture, customer agility and experience. These forces may be addressed by six strategies: Respond to change, address risk, emergent architecture, big design up front and use frameworks and template architectures.

== Definition ==
Several attempts have been made to specify what makes up an agile approach to architecture. According to the SAFe framework, the principles of agile architecture are:

1. The teams that code the system design the system
2. Build the simplest architecture that can possibly work
3. When in doubt, code it out
4. They build it, they test it
5. The bigger the system, the longer the runway
6. System architecture is a role collaboration
7. There is no monopoly on innovation

== Principles ==
At the enterprise architecture level, Scott Ambler (2016) proposes the following principles:

- Communication over perfection
- Active stakeholder participation
- Enablement over inspection (exemplars)
- Evolutionary collaboration over blueprinting
- Enterprise architects are active participants on development teams
- High level models (the more complex, the more abstract)
- Capture details with working code
- Lean guidance and rules, not bureaucratic procedures
- Have a dedicated team of experienced enterprise architects

== Practices ==
The open source Design Practice Repository (DPR) collects agile architecting practices such as:

- SMART NFR Elicitation
- Architectural decision Capturing
- Stepwise Service Design
