= Ikujiro Nonaka =

Japanese organizational theorist (1935–2025)

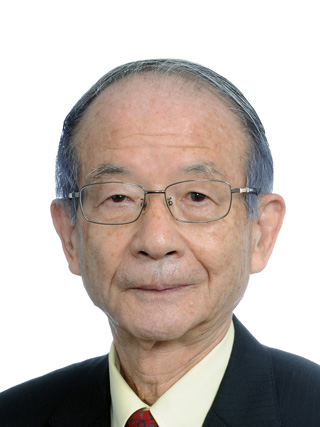

Ikujiro Nonaka (野中 郁次郎, Nonaka Ikujirō; 10 May 1935 – 25 January 2025) was a Japanese organizational theorist and Professor at the Graduate School of International Corporate Strategy of the Hitotsubashi University. Known for developing the Theory of Organizational Knowledge Creation, which explains how organizations generate continuous and sustainable innovation through the creation and conversion of individual, group, and organizational knowledge. He has also been a key figure in the field of knowledge management.

== Life and career ==
Nonaka was born in Tokyo on 10 May 1935, and as a child lived through World War II. His nationalist spirit led him to believe that Japan should adapt its technological and organizational skills. In 1958 Nonaka received his B.S. in political science from Waseda University.

After graduation Nonaka accepted a job at Fuji Electric, where he initiated a management program. This curriculum was further developed in the 1960s together with the business school of Keio University and offered to companies all over Japan. In 1967 Nonaka moved to the United States where in 1968 he obtained an MBA and in 1972 a PhD in Business Administration, both at the University of California, Berkeley.

Nonaka was the First Distinguished Drucker Scholar in Residence at the Drucker School and Institute, Claremont Graduate University; the Xerox Distinguished Faculty Scholar, Institute of Management, Innovation and Organization, UC Berkeley. Back in Japan he became professor at the Graduate School of International Corporate Strategy of Hitotsubashi University.

Nonaka died from pneumonia on 25 January 2025, at the age of 89.

== Work ==
Nonaka co-wrote several noteworthy articles with Hirotaka Takeuchi, a colleague at Hitotsubashi University, including:

- The article The New New Product Development Game, in which they emphasised speed and flexibility for new product development. This article is considered to be one of the roots of the Scrum framework, one of the most used agile software development techniques.
- The Nonaka-Takeuchi model of accumulation of tacit knowledge.

In 2008, the Wall Street Journal listed him as one of the most influential persons on business thinking, and The Economist included him in its "Guide to Management Ideas and Gurus".

Nonaka also proposed the SECI model, to present the spiraling knowledge processes of interaction between explicit knowledge and tacit knowledge. SECI is short for:

- Socialization
- Externalization
- Combination
- Internalization

== Awards and recognition ==
Ikujiro Nonaka received the Japan Academy Prize in 2010 for his contributions to organizational theory and knowledge creation.

In 2013, he was awarded the Thinkers50 Lifetime Achievement Award in recognition of his lasting impact on management thinking, particularly in the field of knowledge management. He has also been inducted into the Thinkers50 Hall of Fame, which recognizes the most influential management thinkers globally.

His book The Knowledge-Creating Company (with Hirotaka Takeuchi) is considered an influential work in the field of organizational knowledge and has had a significant impact on both academic research and business practice.

== Selected bibliography ==
- Essence of Failure: Organizational Study of the Japanese Armed Forces during the World War II (with R. Tobe, Y. Teramoto, S. Kamata, T. Suginoo and T. Murai), Tokyo: Diamond-sha, 1984 (in Japanese).
- Nonaka, Ikujiro; Takeuchi, Hirotaka (1995), The knowledge creating company: how Japanese companies create the dynamics of innovation, New York: Oxford University Press, p. 284, ISBN 978-0-19-509269-1
- Enabling Knowledge Creation (with G. von Krogh and K. Ichijo), New York: Oxford University Press, 2000.
- Hitotsubashi on Knowledge Management (with co-authors), John Wiley (Asia), 2003.
- The Essence of Innovation (with A. Katsumi), Tokyo: Nikkei BP, 2004 (in Japanese).
- The Essence of Strategy (with co-authors), Tokyo: Nikkei BP, 2005 (in Japanese).
- Managing Flow (with T. Hirata and R. Toyama), Palgrave Macmillan, 2008.
- The Core of Organization is People (with H. Sakai, H. Yoshida, T. Sakikawa, T. Hirata, K. Isomura and Yasunobu NARITA), Kyoto: Nakanishiya, 2009 (in Japanese).
- The Philosophy-Creating Company (with K. Genma, T. Hirata, K. Isomura and Yasunobu NARITA), Kyoto: Nakanishiya, 2012 (in Japanese).

About Ikujiro Nonaka

- Nonaka, Ikujiro (1991), "The Knowledge-Creating Company", Harvard Business Review, 69 (6 Nov-Dec): 96–104
- Gourlay, Stephen (2003), "The SECI model of knowledge creation: some empirical shortcomings", 4th European Conference on Knowledge Management, Oxford, England, 18-19 Sep 2003, pp. 377–385
- Strategy Business Magazine article in Winter 2008 issue
