= Change control board =

Committee in software development

In software development, projects and programs, a change control board (CCB) is a committee that consists of Subject Matter Experts (SME, e.g. software engineers, testing experts, etc.) and Managers (e.g. Quality Assurance managers), who decide whether to implement proposed changes to a project. The main objective of a CCB is to ensure the client accepts the project. Factors affecting a CCB's decision can include the project's phase of development, budget, schedule, and quality goals.

Change control (see Scope management) is also part of Requirements engineering. CCBs are most associated with the waterfall method of software development, but can be seen as having analogues in some implementations of Agile software development.

The Change Control Board will review any proposed changes from the original baseline requirements that were agreed upon with the client. If any change is agreed upon by the committee, the change is communicated to the project team and the client, and the requirement is baselined with the change. The authority of the Change Control Board may vary from project to project (see e.g. Consensus-based decision making), but decisions reached by the Change Control Board are often accepted as final and binding.

A typical Change Control Board might consist of the development manager, the test lead, and a product manager. Less commonly, the client might directly advocate their interests as part of the Change Control Board.

== See also ==
- Change management (ITSM)
- Change-advisory board
- Project management
- Requirements engineering
- Configuration management
