= Product backlog =

List in product management

Within agile project management, product backlog refers to a prioritized list of functionality which a product should contain. It is sometimes referred to as a to-do list, and is considered an 'artifact' (a form of documentation) within the scrum software development framework. The product backlog is referred to with different names in different project management frameworks, such as product backlog in scrum, work item list in disciplined agile, and option pool in lean. In the scrum framework, creation and continuous maintenance of the product backlog is part of the responsibility of the product owner.

A sprint backlog consists of selected elements from the product backlog which are planned to be developed within that particular sprint.

In scrum, coherence is defined as a measure of the relationships between backlog items which make them worthy of consideration as a whole.

== Outline ==
The agile product backlog in scrum is a prioritized features list, containing short descriptions of all functionality desired in the product. When applying the scrum or other agile development methodology, it is not necessary to start a project with a lengthy, upfront effort to document all requirements as is more common with traditional project management methods following the waterfall model. Instead, a scrum team and its product owner will typically begin by writing down every relevant feature they can think of for the project's agile backlog prioritization, and the initial agile product backlog is almost always more than enough for a first sprint. The scrum product backlog is then allowed to grow further throughout the project life cycle and change as more is learned about the product and its customers.

A typical scrum backlog comprises features, bugs, technical work and knowledge acquisition.
