= System deployment =

Type of deployment of a mechanical device, electrical system, or computer program

The deployment of a mechanical device, electrical system, computer program, etc., is part of the systems development life cycle (SDLC) and is the assembly or transformation from a packaged form to an operationally working state.

Deployment implies moving a product from a temporary or development state to a permanent or desired state.

== See also ==
- IT infrastructure deployment
- Development
- Innovation
- Product life-cycle theory
- Software deployment
