= Jim Highsmith =

American software engineer (born 1945)

James A. Highsmith III (born 1945) is an American software engineer and author of books in the field of software development methodology. He is the creator of Adaptive Software Development, described in his 1999 book "Adaptive Software Development", and winner of the 2000 Jolt Award, and the Stevens Award in 2005. Highsmith was one of the 17 original signatories of the Agile Manifesto, the founding document for agile software development.

== Life and work ==
Jim Highsmith has more than 25 years experience as an IT manager, project manager, product manager, consultant, and software developer. He has consulted with IT, software, and product-development companies in the U.S., Europe, Canada, Japan, India, South Africa, Australia, and New Zealand to help them adapt to an accelerated pace of development in increasingly complex, unstable environments. He has also worked at NASA. Jim Highsmith's areas of consulting include agile software development, collaboration, and project management. Highsmith was also an executive consultant at Thoughtworks, a global software consultancy company.

Working as a principal of Information Architects, Inc., based in Salt Lake City, Highsmith taught and consulted on software quality process improvement, project management, and accelerated development techniques. He has also served as director of the Agile Project Management Advisory Service for the Cutter Consortium. The Cutter Consortium is an IT advisory firm that has included a group of more than 125 internationally recognized experts who have come together to offer information, consulting and training. He is also one of the founders of the Agile Project Leadership Network.

In the book Adaptive Software Development (1999), Jim Highsmith uses the analogy of mountain climbing to illustrate his points about teamwork, planning, and adaptation to rapidly changing conditions. The book contains the following adage: Rules can be barriers to hide behind or guidelines for the wise to consider and break when the circumstances justify it. The book also covers the concepts of accidental software development, the adaptive conceptual model, and the adaptive development model.

== Publications ==
Jim Highsmith published several articles and books. A selection:

- 1999 Adaptive Software Development: A Collaborative Approach to Managing Complex Systems. Dorset House Publishing.
- 2002 Agile Software Development Ecosystems. Foreword by Tom DeMarco. Addison-Wesley Pearson Education.
- 2004 Agile Project Management: Creating Innovative Products. Addison-Wesley Professional.
- 2013 Adaptive Leadership: Accelerating Enterprise Agility. Addison-Wesley Professional.
- 2019 EDGE: Value-Driven Digital Transformation. Addison-Wesley Professional.
