= Richard Turner (computer scientist) =

Richard Turner (born 1954) is a distinguished service professor in the School of Systems and Enterprises of Stevens Institute of Technology in Hoboken, New Jersey.

Turner has a BA in mathematics from Huntingdon College, an MS in computer science from the University of Louisiana-Lafayette, and a DSc in engineering management from the George Washington University.

Before joining Stevens, he was a Fellow of the Systems and Software Consortium Inc., a research professor at The George Washington University, a computer scientist at the Federal Aviation Administration, and technical manager and practitioner with various DC area businesses working with defense, intelligence, and commercial clients. He has also served as a visiting scientist at the Software Engineering Institute of Carnegie Mellon University, and consulted independently.

Much of his research at Stevens has been through the Systems Engineering Research Center (SERC) supporting the U.S. Department of Defense, particularly on the integration of systems and software engineering and the acquisition of complex defense systems. He was on the original author team of the CMMI and a core author of the Software Extension to the Guide to the Project Management Body of Knowledge PMI and IEEE Computer Society.

He is a Senior Member of the IEEE, a Golden Core Awardee of the IEEE Computer Society, and a Fellow of the Lean Systems Society.

He has authored / co authored several books:-

- The Incremental Commitment Spiral Model: Principles and Practices for Successful Systems and Software, by Barry Boehm, Jo Ann Lane, Supannika Koolmanojwong, and Richard Turner: Addison-Wesley, (2014). ISBN 978-0321808226
- CMMI (Capability Maturity Model Integration) Distilled: A Practical Introduction to Integrated Process Improvement, by Dennis M. Ahern, Aaron Clouse, Richard Turner: Addison-Wesley, (Third Edition 2008). ISBN 0-321-46108-8
- CMMI Survival Guide: Just enough process improvement, by Suzanne Garcia, Richard Turner: Addison-Wesley, (2007). ISBN 0-321-42277-5
- Balancing Agility and Discipline: A Guide for the Perplexed by Barry Boehm, Richard Turner: Addison-Wesley, (Paperback - September 26, 2003) ISBN 0-321-18612-5
- An interactive simulator for MATHILDA-RIKKE on multics: Concept, design and implementation by Richard Turner, Publisher: Computer Science Dept., University of Southwestern, Louisiana (1977)

Turner lives in the District of Columbia with his wife, Johanna - they have three grown children and two grandchildren.
