= IT infrastructure deployment =

Concept in deployment planning

IT infrastructure deployment typically involves defining the sequence of operations or steps, often referred to as a deployment plan, that must be carried to deliver changes into a target system environment. The individual operations within a deployment plan can be executed manually or automatically. Deployment plans are usually well defined and approved prior to the deployment date. In situations where there is a high potential risk of failure in the target system environment, deployment plans may rehearsed to ensure there are no issues during actual deployment. Structured repeatable deployments are also prime candidates for automation which drives quality and efficiency.

== Deployment planning objectives ==
The objective of Deployment Planning is to ensure that changes deployed into a target system environment are executed in a structure and repeatable manner in order to reduce the risk of failure. The purpose of release and deployment planning is to:

- Define and agree release and deployment plans with customers/stakeholders.
- Ensure that each release package consists of a set of related assets and service components that are compatible with each other.
- Ensure that integrity of a release package and its constituent components is maintained throughout the transition activities and recorded accurately in the configuration management system.
- Ensure that all release and deployment packages can be tracked, installed, tested, verified, and/or uninstalled or backed out, if appropriate.
- Ensure that change is managed during the release and deployment activities.
- Record and manage deviations, risks, issues related to the new or changed service, and take necessary corrective action.
- Ensure that there is knowledge transfer to enable the customers and users to optimise their use of the service to support their business activities.
- Ensure that skills and knowledge are transferred to operations and support staff to enable them to effectively and efficiently deliver, support and maintain the service, according to required warranties and service levels

== Deployment plan template ==
A deployment template is an unbound deployment plan which defines the steps of execution but not the profiles and systems. Deployment templates are patterns from which deployment plans can be created.

Typical information captured for each step in the deployment plan is:

- Sequence Number
- Activity Name
- Activity Description
- Scripted Instruction
- Start Date & Time
- Expected Duration
- Dependent Activities
- Responsible Resource

== See also ==
- Release management
- Change management
- Configuration management
- ITIL
- Software deployment
