= Ken Schwaber =

American computer scientist (born 1945)

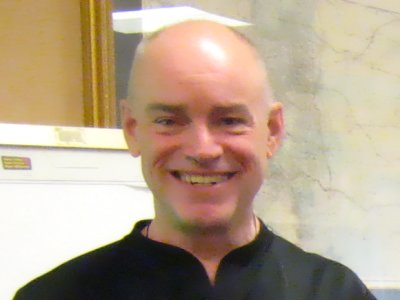
- Born: 1945 (age 79–80); Wheaton, Illinois, United States
- Known for: Creating scrum development
- Website: kenschwaber.wordpress.com

Ken Schwaber (born 1945 in Wheaton, Illinois) is a software developer, product manager and industry consultant. He worked with Jeff Sutherland to formulate the initial versions of the Scrum framework and to present Scrum as a formal process at OOPSLA'95. Schwaber and Sutherland are two of the 17 initial signatories of the Agile Manifesto. They are co-authors of the Scrum Guide. Schwaber runs Scrum.org, which provides Scrum resources, training, assessments, and certifications for Scrum Masters, Scrum Developers, Scrum Product Owners, and organizations using Scrum.

He is one of the leaders of the agile software development movement. He is a founder of the Agile Alliance, and he is responsible for founding the Scrum Alliance and creating the Certified Scrum Master programs and its derivatives. He resigned from the Scrum Alliance in 2009 after a disagreement with the board regarding assessments, certification, and a developer program. He subsequently founded Scrum.org. At Scrum.org, he led the development of new courseware, assessments, and partnerships to improve the quality and effectiveness of Scrum. He has published and updated Scrum with Jeff Sutherland, and wrote "Software in Thirty Days" also with Sutherland.

== Works ==
- Schwaber, Ken (February 1, 2004). Agile Project Management with Scrum. Microsoft Press. ISBN 978-0-7356-1993-7.
- Schwaber, Ken; Beedle, Mike (February 18, 2002). Agile Software Development with Scrum. Prentice Hall. ISBN 978-0-13-067634-4.
- Schwaber, Ken (2007). The Enterprise and Scrum. Microsoft Press. ISBN 978-0-7356-2337-8.
- Schwaber, Ken; Sutherland, Jeff (2012). Software in 30 Days: How Agile Managers Beat the Odds, Delight Their Customers, And Leave Competitors In the Dust. Wiley. ISBN 978-1118206669.
