= Cross-functional team =

Group of people with different expertise on the same team

A cross-functional team (XFN), also known as a multidisciplinary team or interdisciplinary team, is a group of people with different functional expertise working toward a common goal. It may include people from finance, marketing, operations, and human resources departments. Typically, it includes employees from all levels of an organization. Members may also come from outside an organization (in particular, from suppliers, key customers, or consultants).

Cross-functional teams often function as self-directed teams assigned to a specific task which calls for the input and expertise of numerous departments. Assigning a task to a team composed of multi-disciplinary individuals increases the level of creativity and establishes common opinion. Each member offers an alternative perspective to the problem and potential solution to the task. In business today, innovation is a leading competitive advantage and cross-functional teams promote innovation through a creative collaboration process. Members of a cross-functional team need not be well versed in multi-tasking per se, but must be prepared to help out in different aspects of building an actual product as they are collectively responsible for their cross-functional team duties as well as their normal day-to-day work tasks.

Some researchers have viewed cross-functional interactions as cooperative or competitive in nature, while others have argued that organization's functional areas are often forced to compete and cooperate simultaneously with one another (“coopetition”) and it is critical to understand how these complex relationships interplay and affect firm performance.

Decision making within a team may depend on consensus, but often is led by a manager/coach/team leader. Leadership can be a significant challenge with cross-functional teams. Leaders are charged with the task of directing team members of various disciplines. They must transform different variations of input into one cohesive final output. Cross-functional teams can be likened to the board of directors of a company. A group of individuals of various backgrounds and disciplines are assembled to collaborate in an efficient manner in order to better the organization or solve a problem.

Some organizations are built around cross-functional workflows by having reporting lines to multiple managers. This type of management is called matrix management, and such organizations are often called matrix organizations.

== Effects ==
The growth of self-directed cross-functional teams has influenced decision-making processes and organizational structures. Although management theory likes to propound that every type of organizational structure needs to make strategic, tactical, and operational decisions, new procedures have started to emerge that work best with teams.

=== Less unidirectional ===
Up until recently, decision making flowed in one direction. Overall corporate-level objectives drove strategic business unit (SBU) objectives, and these in turn, drove functional level objectives. Today, organizations have flatter structures, companies diversify less, and functional departments have started to become less well-defined. The rise of self-directed teams reflects these trends. Intra-team dynamics tend to become multi-directional rather than hierarchical. Interactive processes encourage consensus within teams. Also the directives given to the team tend to become more general and less prescribed.

=== Greater scope of information ===
Cross-functional teams require a wide range of information to make decisions. They need to draw on information from all parts of an organization's information base, including data from all functional departments. System integration becomes important because it makes all information accessible through a single interface. An inherent benefit of a cross-functional team is the breadth of knowledge that each member brings to the group. Each team member represents a department and can therefore leverage their familiarity with accessing and providing knowledge from that department to support the team. This increases the efficiency of a cross-functional team by reducing the time spent gathering information.

=== Greater depth of information ===
Cross-functional teams require information from all levels of management. These teams may be formed to address primarily strategic, tactical, or operational decisions, but they require all three types of information. Most self-directed teams need information that is traditionally used in strategic, tactical, and operational decision-making. For example, new product development is traditionally considered a tactical process. It receives strategic direction from top management and relies on operational departments, such as engineering and marketing, to carry out its tasks. However, a new product development team typically consists of individuals from these operational departments and often includes a representative from top management.

In many cases, the team would make unstructured strategic decisions—such as what markets to compete in, what new production technologies to invest in, and what return on investment to require; tactical decisions like whether to build a prototype, whether to concept-test, whether to test-market, and how much to produce; and structured operational decisions like production scheduling, inventory purchases, and media flightings. In other cases, the team would confine itself to tactical and operational decisions. In either case it would need information associated with all three levels.

=== Greater range of users ===
Cross-functional teams consist of people from different parts of an organization. Information must be made understandable to all users. Not only engineers use technical data, and not only accountants use financial data, and not only human resources personnel use HR data. Modern organizations lack middle managers to combine, sort, and prioritize the data. Technical, financial, marketing, and all other types of information must come in a form that all members of a cross-functional team can understand. This involves reducing the amount of specialized jargon, sorting information based on importance, hiding complex statistical procedures from the users, giving interpretations of results, and providing clear explanations of difficult. Data visualization systems can present complex results in an intuitive manner.

=== Less goal dominated ===
Since Peter Drucker in 1954 book The Practice of Management published his views on management by objectives, business decision making has become more goal-oriented. Managers have come to view decision-making generally, and strategic thinking in particular, as a multi-stage process that starts with an assessment of the current situation, defining objectives, then determining how to reach these objectives. Management by objectives took this basic scheme and applied it to virtually all significant decisions.

Today many firms have started to opt for a less structured, more interactive approach. One way of implementing this involves using self-directed cross-functional teams. Proponents hope that these teams will develop strategies that will redefine industries and create new “best practice”. They think that incremental improvements do not suffice.

Cross-functional teams, using unstructured techniques and searching for revolutionary competitive advantages, allegedly require information systems featuring increased interactivity, more flexibility, and the capability of dealing with fuzzy logic. Artificial intelligence may one day be useful in this aspect.

== Collaboration in cross-functional teams ==
Many teams in large organizations face challenges in creating a collaborative atmosphere when dealing with cross-functional dependencies and working with peers from other functions. In general, organizational structures do not adequately support cross-functional collaboration among teams.

Smooth communication is the base of the cross-functional teams. Team must schedule all meetings, and prepare the agenda for each. Team must know of what is to be discussed.

== See also ==
- Ambidextrous organization
- Organization design
- Organizational structure
- Secretary of Defense-Empowered Cross-Functional Teams
- Task force
- Tiger team
- Total quality management
- United States Army Futures Command § Cross-functional teams
