= Agile =

Agile may refer to:

- Agile, an entity that possesses agility

== Project management ==
- Agile software development, a development method
- Agile construction, iterative and incremental construction method
- Agile learning, the application of incremental and iterative methods to learning processes
- Agile manufacturing, an organization able to respond quickly to customer needs and market changes
- Agile management, the application of the principles of Agile software development and lean management to various management processes
- Agile marketing, flexible and adaptable marketing using agile constructs

== Military ==
- AIM-95 Agile, an air-to-air missile
- HMS Agile, a never-built Amphion-class submarine
- Project AGILE, a 1960s ARPA program
- USS Agile, two minesweepers

== Other uses ==
- AGILE (clinical trial), an evaluation of treatments for SARS-CoV-2 infection
- AGILE (satellite) (Astro-rivelatore Gamma a Immagini LEggero), an astronomical satellite of the Italian Space Agency
- Agile (horse) (born 1902), American thoroughbred racehorse, winner of the 1905 Kentucky Derby
- Agile (producer) (born 1975), Canadian hip-hop music producer
- Agile, a member of the X-Hunters in the video game Mega Man X2
- Chevrolet Agile, a subcompact car
- Wallis WA-116 Agile, a 1960s British autogyro, used in the James Bond film You Only Live Twice
- Agile (species group), a wasp species complex in the genus Pison
- Association of Geographic Information Laboratories in Europe (AGILE)

== See also ==
- Agile Project Management (book), by Jim Highsmith
- Agility (disambiguation)
