= Heather Moore =

American engineer

- Born: Michigan, United States
- Education: University of Michigan
- Occupation: Engineer
- Known for: research on productivity on construction and information entropy

Heather Moore is an engineer from Michigan known for her research in construction management and construction productivity. She is the Vice President of Operations at MCA. She studied Industrial and Operations Engineering at the University of Michigan, and also holds an MBA from the University of Michigan-Flint, and later obtained a Ph. D in Construction Management at the Michigan State University. Her Ph.D. research focused on information entropy, with specific application in construction. Her papers and research have been used in innovation in construction development. She has co-authored two books on improving productivity on construction job sites and has published many articles in specialized magazines, including work referencing both MCA's experience in Agile Construction and the ASTM standard in combination with information entropy. She has also contributed to other books and research work conducted at MCA on topics of productivity and process design.

Heather has written two books with Perry Daneshgari focused on productivity in construction, and has written articles in magazines like Construction Executive, IEC Insights Magazine, ASTM, Electrical Construction & Management Magazine among others blogs and pages. She has conducted research for Electri International (links) and New Horizons Foundation. (link) besides her academic research for the University of Michigan. She is now Vice President of Operations for MCA but has been Manager of Research and Assistant Implementer. Before MCA she worked for John E. Green Company.

== Bibliography ==
- Competing in the New Construction Environment A Compilation to Lead the Way - Book 1: The Here and Now-How to Be Competitive.
- Application of ASTM E2691 Standard Practice for Job Productivity Measurement in Agile Construction
- Operational Model Needed to Compete in Industrialized Construction - Industrialization of Construction, A Compilation to Lead the Way, Book 2:
- Industrialization of Construction, A Compilation to Lead the Way, Foundation and Future, Dealing with the Challenges of More Work, Book 3:
- Efficiency and Continuous Improvement: Survival of the Unfits - Book 4:
- Industrialization of Construction: How it will happen, and how to stay ahead using Agile Construction
