= Perry Daneshgari =

- Born: Parviz Daneshgari; Ahvaz, Iran
- Other name: Parviz Daneshgari
- Occupations: civil and mechanical engineer, CEO
- Known for: research in construction worksites
- Notable work: Agile Construction for the electrical contractor

Perry (Parviz) Daneshgari is an Iranian-American entrepreneur, engineer and author born in Ahvaz, Iran. He founded MCA, which appeared on the TV Program World Business Review, in 1990 and has written many books and articles in specialized magazines and websites. Perry has an MBA from Wayne State University and a Ph.D. in mechanical engineering from the University of Karlsruhe, as well as B.S. in civil and mechanical engineering from Northwestern University. He specializes in Agile Construction, a way of doing business that focuses on adaptation and quick changes on job sites and production lines.

Daneshgari has collaborated with research projects on different industries, most of them focused on increasing productivity in those industries applying agile methods of working, for example: “Developing a Standard Format for Calculating Construction size and Share”, “Ideal Jobsite Inventory Levels to Improve Profitability” for Electri International and other organization like Sheet Metal and Air Conditioning Contractors National Association, NAED Education and Research Foundation, New Horizons Foundation, etc.. Perry in collaboration with Heather Moore and MCA have written articles in some specialized magazines like Electrical Contracting Magazine, The Electrical Distribution Magazine, and more. Dr. Daneshgari has been featured in trade publications such as Electrical Contractor, EC&M, and CFMA Building Profits. He has also appeared on programs like World Business Review.

== Early life and education ==
Dr. Perry (Parviz) Daneshgari was born in Ahvaz, Iran. Little is publicly documented about his childhood or family background beyond his Iranian origins, though he pursued higher education in engineering fields across multiple institutions in the United States and Germany.

He earned a B.S. in both civil and mechanical engineering from Northwestern University. Daneshgari later obtained a Ph.D. in mechanical engineering from the University of Karlsruhe (now Karlsruhe Institute of Technology). He completed an MBA from Wayne State University.

These degrees positioned him for expertise in engineering and business, particularly in applying mechanical engineering principles to construction productivity research.

== Career ==
Entrepreneurship & MCA, Inc. Dr. Daneshgari founded MCA, Inc. in 1990, a company focused on improving productivity in construction through Agile methodologies.

Research & Consulting Work Dr. Perry Daneshgari is widely recognized for developing Agile Construction® methodology, and has worked with major associations like NECA, MCAA, and CFMA. He has developed the ASTM standard E2691, a standard for the measurement of Construction Productivity. He has worked hard to develop Job Productivity Measurement (JPM), a new standard practice for measuring construction productivity by measuring work performed compared to construction put in place. Dr. Daneshgari has also written the Prefabrication of Electrical Installation for Construction (NECA 5-2022) an American National standard for Prefabrication.

Teaching & Public Speaking Dr. Daneshgari has been a guest lecturer at the University of Michigan and a frequent speaker for major construction industry events, such as NECA and IEC.

== Publications/Bibliography ==
- Agile Construction for the electrical contractor
- The Chase: Constant Pursuit For Improvement
- Lean Operations in Wholesale Distribution
- Agile Construction, a Profitable construction, higher profits and better cash flow.
- Application of ASTM E2691 Standard Practice for Job Productivity Measurement in Agile Construction
- Competing in the New Construction Environment: A Compilation to Lead the Way - The Here and Now-How to Be Competitive, Book 1:
- Operational Model Needed to Compete in Industrialized Construction - Industrialization of Construction, A Compilation to Lead the Way, Book 2:
- Industrialization of Construction, A Compilation to Lead the Way, Foundation and Future, Dealing with the Challenges of More Work, Book 3:
- Efficiency and Continuous Improvement: Survival of the Unfits - Book 4:
- Agile Distribution®, Application of Lean Principles:
- Industrialization of Construction: How it will happen, and how to stay ahead using Agile Construction
- Prefabrication of Electrical Installations for Construction (NECA 5-2022)
- The Financial Impact of Re-Electrification of the U.S. CFMA Building Profits Magazine March/April 2026
- Re-electrification of the U.S.: Forecasting the Impact of Data Center Work. CFMA Building Profits Magazine 2025
