= European Association of Remote Sensing Laboratories =

The European Association of Remote Sensing Laboratories (EARSeL) in an organization founded in 1977 under the auspices of the European Space Agency, the Council of Europe and the European Commission. As of 2020, EARSeL encompasses more than 250 remote sensing research laboratories across Europe.

It co-sponsors the European Journal of Remote Sensing (published by Taylor & Francis), the Remote Sensing and Digital Image Processing book series (published by Springer Nature), and the EARSeL conference proceedings series.

== See also ==
- Association of Geographic Information Laboratories for Europe
