= European Journal of Remote Sensing =

- Discipline: Remote sensing
- Language: English

Publication details
- Publisher: Taylor & Francis

Standard abbreviations
- ISO 4: Eur. J. Remote Sens.

Indexing
- ISSN: 2279-7254

The European Journal of Remote Sensing (EuJRS) is an academic journal about remote sensing published by Taylor & Francis on behalf of the Associazione Italiana di Telerilevamento (Italian Association of Remote Sensing) and co-sponsored by the European Association of Remote Sensing Laboratories (EARSeL). Its editor-in-chief is Marco Marchetti; its 2018 impact factor is 1.904.
