= Agility (disambiguation) =

Agility is the ability to change the body's position efficiently.

Agility may also refer to:

== Sport ==
- Dog agility, a sport for dogs in which they must be quick-moving and nimble
- Rabbit agility, a sport for rabbits
- Rat agility, a sport for rats

== Other uses ==
- Business agility, an agile firm has the capabilities and processes to respond to unexpected environmental changes
- Agility, enterprise-based media encoding software by Anystream
- Agility Logistics, a Kuwaiti company
- Agility PR Solutions, a media analysis provider
- Agility Trains, a railway company
- Agility Robotics, an American robotics company founded in 2015

== See also ==
- Agile software development, a conceptual framework in computing
- Agile (disambiguation)
