= Association of Geographic Information Laboratories in Europe =

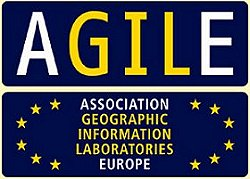
The AGILE logo.

The Association of Geographic Information Laboratories in Europe (AGILE) was established to promote academic teaching and research on geographic information science and systems (GIS) at the European level.

== History and organization ==
AGILE was established in early 1998 to ensure the continuation of the networking activities that have emerged as a result of the EGIS Conferences and the European Science Foundation GISDATA Scientific Programmes.

AGILE seeks to ensure that the views of the geographic information teaching and research community are fully represented in the discussions that take place on future European research agendas. AGILE also provides a permanent scientific forum where geographic information researchers can meet and exchange ideas and experiences at the European level.

Activities of AGILE are managed by an eight-person council elected by its members. Its main tasks are to develop an organisational structure to realize the goals of AGILE, to further develop with the help of the members a European research agenda, to instigate and stimulate initiatives, and to organize a yearly GI-conference.

== Mission ==
The title of the organisation conveys the following:

- it is an Association
- consisting of geographic information laboratories
- in Europe.

The idea of an Association presents few problems nor does the term "Europe". However, the use of the term "geographic information laboratories" needs some clarification. The term "laboratories" emphasises that this is an association of groups rather than individuals. It also reflects the fact that geographic information teaching and/or research tends to be a group activity in most institutions.

The mission of AGILE is: "to promote academic teaching and research on GIS at the European level and to ensure the continuation of the networking activities that have emerged as a result of the EGIS Conferences and the European Science Foundation GISDATA Scientific Programme.

Although rather wordy, the mission statement highlights the two main objectives of AGILE:

- to promote academic teaching and research at the European level. This will be reflected by the organisation of initiatives on specific topics intended to influence the future European geographic information research agenda.
- to facilitate networking activities between geographic information laboratories at the European level. This will be reflected in several different kinds of activity including focused meetings based on state-or-the-art presentations on key research issues and European geographic information research conferences.

== See also ==
- European Association of Remote Sensing Laboratories
- Infrastructure for Spatial Information in the European Community (INSPIRE)
