= USS Agile =

Two ships of United States Navy have been named Agile.

- USS Agile (AMc-111), was a wooden coastal minesweeper in service from 1941 to 1946.
- USS Agile (MSO-421), was a non-ferromagnetic ocean minesweeper launched in 1955 and sold in 1980.
