= Agile construction =

Management system in the construction industry

Agile construction is an integrated system of principles and methods, and a philosophy of doing business adapted to jobsites and overall project delivery in the construction industry. It is born from agile manufacturing and project management, which is mostly used in manufacturing production, automotive and software developing teams. It is the application of the Toyota Production System to the construction industry, with two parallel paths: Measuring (ASTM E2691) and improving productivity, as well as segregating and externalizing work through prefabrication and supply chain management.

Like the Toyota Production System, agile construction principles form a system that relies on input from the source of the work information, both up front for planning the project, as well as throughout the life of a project for real-time feedback. The real-time input produces real-time measurements of productivity and allows for improved responsiveness to changes on the jobsite. Iterative and incremental agile construction methods help manage the design and build of efficient, low-risk processes and activities. This means that each time a process is repeated some changes are made to improve the process. Changes for the better are kept and for the worse are discarded.

The eight agile construction principles are:

- Agile construction project management
- Agile construction labor productivity measurement and labor productivity improvement
- Agile construction job scheduling and planning
- Agile construction procurement and material management
- Agile construction externalizing work, through prefabrication (components or parts pre-assembled off-site by suppliers or in a prefab shop, to reduce time, risk, and complexity)
- Agile construction labor management and labor composite rate reduction (the average cost of a job crew member to the company per unit of time)
- Agile construction estimation accuracy and improvement
- Agile construction project financial management

Agile construction principles help contractors to make processes visible, measurable and manageable to improve the ability to rapidly adapt to job site changes, by minimizing the time between when a risk is detected and when it gets corrected. This requires a better mechanism to predict and capture these changes accompanied with a better infrastructure for addressing them. Agile Construction project management can also make gains in pre-design and design phases of construction projects. Accompanied with a well-trained and highly motivated workforce, companies using agile construction operations are able to increase responsiveness and productivity, to reduce cost and to deliver a better customer value.

== See also ==
- Electrical contractor
- Procurement
- Productivity
- Agile management

== Additional References ==
- Daneshgari, Perry, and Heather Moore. Prefabrication Handbook for the Construction Industry: Agile Construction Application through Externalizing Work, 2019.
- Industrialization of Construction: How it will happen, and how to stay ahead using Agile Construction (2024)
- Moore, D. H., and O'Dell, D (2022). Gang Boxes – Making them come alive with Agile Intelligence™. IEC, Insights Magazine.
- Daneshgari, D. P., & Moore, D. H. (2021). How Will Working from Home Catalyze Industrialization?. CFMA.
- Moore, D. H. and Parvin, S (2021). How Industrialized are You? Measuring Your Company’s Progress. CFMA.
- Daneshgari, D. P., & Moore, D. H. (2020). Jobsite to Garage: Changing the Mindset of Prefab & Modular Construction. CFMA.
- Daneshgari, D. P., & Moore, D. H. (2014). Is Prefabrication Making You Money?. EC&M.
- Daneshgari, D. P.(2013). The Industrialization of Construction. Dassault
- Daneshgari, D. P., & Moore, D. H. (2017). Winds of Change and the Event Horizon. IEC, Insights Magazine.
- Daneshgari, D. P., & Moore, D. H. (2016). A Safe Jobsite is a More Productive Jobsite. IEC, Insights Magazine.
- Daneshgari, D. P., & Moore, D. H. (2015). Applying Scalable Prefabrication to Industrial Construction Work. Construction Executive.
- Daneshgari, D. P., & Wilson, M. (2006). The Profitability of Agile Construction®. CFMA.
- Daneshgari, D. P., & Moore, D. H. (2024). Connecting the Dots: AI & the Future of Construction. CFMA.
- Daneshgari, D. P., Moore, D. H. Daneshgari, J. (2025) Outcomes Over Outputs: A Leader’s Guide to Measuring: CFMA
- Daneshgari, D. P. Moore, D. H. (2025) AI & Construction: Separating Data from Debris: CFMA
- Daneshgari, D. P. Moore, D. H. (2022) Planning Job-Site Lighting Installations: EC&M
- Nimmo, P. (2025) How to Make Off-Site Material Storage Decisions: EC&M
