= Agile Project Management (book) =

Book by Jim Highsmith

Agile Project Management: Creating Innovative Products
- Author: Jim Highsmith
- Language: English
- Genre: Business, Agile manufacturing, Project management
- Publisher: Pearson Education/Addison-Wesley
- Publication date: March 2004
- Publication place: United States
- Media type: Print (Paperback)
- Pages: 277
- ISBN: 0-321-21977-5
- OCLC: 54365242
- Dewey Decimal: 005.1/2 22
- LC Class: QA76.758 .H54 2004

Agile Project Management: Creating Innovative Products by Jim Highsmith discusses the management of projects using the agile software development methodology. The book has been recommended by different reviewers.

The book starts off by stating that new challenges in product development require adaptive, not anticipatory, project management. It then introduces the reader to the basic agile values as written in the Agile Manifesto, and to the 6 guiding principles of agile project management. Next, the agile project management framework is broken down into five project phases and discussed in detail. Lastly, the book ends by talking about the scaling of agile project management approaches and the cultural changes required to continuously produce desired results when using agile practices. It uses a variety of examples from different industries as illustrations.

The book was a finalist for CMP Media's Jolt Awards in 2005, but did not win anything.
