= Agile marketing =

Agile marketing, often termed marketing agility or international marketing agility, comprises sensemaking, speed, iteration, and marketing decisions; marketing decisions are performed in an agile manner, using principles from the Manifesto for Agile Software Development. Marketing Agility was named a research priority for 2020-2022 by the Marketing Science Institute.

Sensemaking, or sense-and-respond in some studies, is identifying opportunities or threats in the market. Marketing decisions, for example the marketing mix, are then made at speed, and quick plausible delivery favored over slower options. Implementation and effectiveness are then monitored and further marketing decisions made as necessary, in an iterative fashion. Marketing agility is customer focused, and has shown benefit in VUCA environments, including in deep uncertainty.

== See also ==
- Marketing
- Agile software development
