= Agile learning =

Self-directed, iterative learning approach

Agile learning generally refers to the transfer of agile methods of project work, especially Scrum, to learning processes. Likewise, agile learning proceeds in incremental steps and through an Iterative design which alternates between phases of learning and doing. The tutors rather have the role of a learning attendant or supporter. In a narrower sense, it is intended to allow competence-oriented, media-based learning in the work process within companies. In addition, the term can take several other meanings and is also often used within e-learning and online environments.

== Background ==
Scrum is a framework for project and product management, in particular for agile software development. Scrum employs an iterative, incremental approach to optimize predictability and control risk. It has been developed from the experience that many development projects are too complex to be included in a full-scale plan, and an essential part of the requirements cannot be fully understood or defined upfront. To eliminate these ambiguities, work is broken into actions that can be completed within time-boxed iterations, called sprints – with clear goals and regular feedback loops. During a sprint, progress and interim results are monitored in short daily meetings. At the end of a sprint, the results, the working process, and the cooperation are reflected upon and a new interval begins.

== In companies ==
=== Requirements ===
The Scrum framework can be well adjusted to the requirements of companies for dynamic, workplace-integrated competence development and the subsequent frequency and intensity with which employees have to educate themselves further and acquire new skills. As complexity and dynamics in the internal and external specialization and collaborations increase the need for training and competence development increases as well. In terms of competence development, organizations therefore have concrete needs that are not met well by classical forms of qualification (e.g. seminar courses, continuing education courses), namely:

- "reduce the time it takes an employee to acquire the necessary competencies to do their job most efficiently and effectively";
- "change the learning context rapidly and in response to the real world";
- "facilitate knowledge sharing within an organization", and
- "support a soft failure environment where mistakes have no impact on the real world, thus promoting a willingness to engage in measured risk-taking, focused on achieving a high level of polished performance in the real world"

There is a need for the integration of knowledge and content management with collaboration technologies and for developing a new (online) manufacturing training methodology to train and build the manufacturing workforce of the future. Such learning environments and learning processes have as requirements:

- High scalability, to enable qualification measures from a few hours to several hundred;
- Content adaptability, to include new topics as quickly as possible;
- Connectivity to existing organizational structures and software infrastructure in order to start with little effort

So far, however, there are hardly any suitable continuing education formats for this need. One answer to this is the agile learning approach with its flexibility in relation to all three above mentioned requirements. In accordance with Scrum and established psychological findings for an effective pursuit of goals, Agile learning divides an extensive (learning) process into individual, manageable learning phases. Here, too, the three pillars of Scrum of transparency, verification, adaptation apply.

=== Key elements ===
The key elements of agile learning in companies are:

- Teams of peers with similar development goals and a broad spectrum of backgrounds
- Coaches (internal / external) to support the learning process
- Company stakeholders (management, human resource department) represented by a sponsor ("product owner" in Scrum).
- Learning objectives which are broken down within the team into personal learning goals
- Working on tasks from the actual working context
- Sprints to reach sub goals/milestones. The coaches will closely guide this process
- After completion the results will be presented to the project owner and be verified by them

=== Roles within agile learning ===
Parallel to Scrum, three roles can be described, which have slightly different tasks in agile learning.

==== Sponsor ("Product owner") ====
- Defines the learning field and determines a suitable project
- Creates the organizational framework
- Is a liaison person into the organization
- Receives the technical learning progress

==== Coach ("Scrum master") ====
- Technical, didactic and methodical support
- Moderate the process and guide the reflection
- Support in the processing of learning objectives

This role may be supplemented by topic/issue-specific experts

==== Team ====
- Personal learning goals in sprints
- Collaborative, mostly digitally supported collaboration
- Regular joint reflection on the learning process
- Personal, social and professional development

== Agile learning in university ==
In agile teaching and learning, students can take on the role of the client; the agile software development process in which the client is involved is replaced by the learning/teaching process with students and tutors as actors; the increments that implement new functionality in short cycles correspond to the continuous increase in students' abilities in the agile learning/teaching process. Alternatively, to enrich the learning process and remove student learning from hypothetical situations, an industry client or a real-world problem can be used as the foci for learning and acquisition of requisite skills.

Agile methods can be incorporated into courses both as content and as the working method for students. In line with agile concepts, they can also be adapted. For instance, agile problem-based learning is a pedagogical and curricular vehicle used to blur the work-study silos, informal and formal learning spaces and facilitate connected learning. Agile problem-based teaching and learning methods have been used to cultivate learning agility in students in an effort to prepare them for ambiguous and complex work contexts and help students pro-type solutions for complex issues such as human trafficking, informal settlements, youth unemployment, and organ donation Learning agility in a university context is a learned ability which allows students to use feedback from previous assessments and apply their learning in other related or unrelated tasks. Agile implies that learners create content and develop skills alongside teachers in a collaborative yet competitive environment mediated by technology. The role of the teacher is centered on facilitation and project direction from an informed perspective. Learners become self-directed, team-oriented, and individually resilient lifelong learners. A study on the implementation of the agile method into an online higher education context showed that the agile strategies incorporated into project-based learning facilitated team regulation and project management.

Agile practices have been increasingly integrated into professional development initiatives within the education sector. One such approach involves the use of Scrum retrospectives to foster team collaboration and continuous improvement among educators, enabling reflective learning and more effective team-building strategies.

== Potentials and limits of agile learning ==
In agile learning the participants may gain new competencies that are, unlike in classical formal education, directly linked to their work context. In pursuit of individual problem-solving as well as in exchange with the learning team and the coaches, their competence increase becomes recognizable to themselves, so that successful learning strategies can also be harnessed in the future. Therefore, the main potential of this approach lies in the practical relevance of the acquired competencies and the demand-oriented communication of contents, techniques, and skills.

Like any project-oriented teaching/learning method, agile learning reaches its boundaries when the goal is the systematic coverage of a pre-defined curriculum. Exemplary learning cannot ensure this. For subject areas where particular importance is attached to the completeness of learning content (e.g. safety at work or fire protection), classical further education formats are to be preferred. There, agile learning projects can only supplement training with a transfer supporting the sustainable implementation of the learning content in everyday working life.

== See also ==
- Servant leadership – Leadership philosophy
- Waldorf education – Educational philosophy
- Montessori education – Teaching method encouraging autodidacticism
- Mastery learning – Instructional strategy and educational philosophy
