= Agile manufacturing =

Methodology used to improve production

Agile Manufacturing is a modern production approach that enables companies to respond swiftly and flexibly to market changes while maintaining quality and cost control. This methodology is designed to create systems that can adapt dynamically to changing customer demands and external factors such as market trends or supply chain disruptions.

It is mostly related to lean manufacturing. While Lean Manufacturing focuses primarily on minimizing waste and increasing efficiency, Agile Manufacturing emphasizes adaptability and proactive responses to change. The two approaches are complementary and can be combined into a “leagile” system, which balances cost efficiency with flexibility. The principles of Agile Manufacturing, with its focus on flexibility, responsiveness to change, collaboration, and delivering customer value, serve as a foundation for the later development of Agile Software Development.

== Origins ==
The term originated from Lehigh University in 1991. The goal is to create a manufacturing system that can quickly and efficiently respond to changes in customer preferences, market trends and other external factors.

An enabling factor in becoming an agile manufacturer has been the development of manufacturing support technology that allows the marketers, the designers and the production personnel to share a common database of parts and products, to share data on production capacities and problems—particularly where small initial problems may have larger downstream effects. It is a general proposition of manufacturing that the cost of correcting quality issues increases as the problem moves downstream, so that it is cheaper to correct quality problems at the earliest possible point in the process. Another enabling factor for it is the increase in global competition amid market changes and diminishing national barriers.

Agile manufacturing is seen as more than just a hybrid methodology of its predecessors. It is often misinterpreted as a follow up to Lean manufacturing. The key difference between the two is like between a thin and an athletic person, agile being the latter. One can be neither, one or both. In manufacturing theory, being both is often referred to as leagile. According to Martin Christopher, when companies have to decide what to be, they have to look at the customer order cycle (COC) (the time the customers are willing to wait) and the leadtime for getting supplies. If the supplier has a short lead time, lean production is possible. If the COC is short, agile production is beneficial.

Agile manufacturing is an approach to manufacturing which is focused on meeting the needs of customers while maintaining high standards of quality and controlling the overall costs involved in the production of a particular product. This approach is geared towards companies working in a highly competitive environment, where small variations in performance and product delivery can make a huge difference in the long term to a company's survival and reputation among consumers. Agility has been defined, in terms of outcomes, as “dynamic, context specific, aggressively change embracing and growth oriented…succeeding winning profits, market share and customers”

== Core concepts of agile manufacturing ==
Agile manufacturing involves 4 major concepts that make up the gist of it. These are

1. Core competence management
2. Virtual Enterprise
3. Capability for Reconfiguration
4. Knowledge-driven Enterprise

=== Core competence management ===
Core competence is associated with the workforce and the product and it is identified at two related levels: the individual and the firm. The individual's core competences include skills, knowledge, attitude and expertise. These can be upgraded and refined via investments in training and education. The people of an organization are considered to be critical resources in an organization.

Core competence is derived from corporate wide learning process, integration of diverse skills and streams of technologies, work organization, creation and delivery of value and capability of inter organizational cooperation. For strategic importance and long-term benefits, core competence should provide multi-venturing capability, access to a wide market spectrum, enrich customer valuing, and be difficult for competitors to copy.

It is challenging to build core competencies but it is up to the management to do so. The management should list the company's main capabilities and identify missing links. They should then either in source them or acquire them thru alliances (even if it has to be with competitors). Cooperation and competitors are compatible in the agile framework. Cooperation is of the utmost importance since it provides a platform that enables rapid response times. The advent of the internet allows for physically dispersed personnel to collaborate with ease via virtual corporations. These virtual corporations also help with the availability and velocity of competence carriers in alliances.

=== Virtual Enterprise ===
The virtual enterprise is different from the traditional corporate alliance. There are three levels of cooperation among enterprises lead to virtual partnership. The stages are as follows

1. Stage one: Enterprises operate as isolated islands.
2. Stage two: Corporate-level interactions with little operational-level liaison.
3. Stage three: Agile organizations form virtual enterprises, cooperating at both corporate and operational levels. Agile teams work across company partners.

A virtual partnerships enables harnessing and coordination of resources and diverse skills for manufacturing products quickly and facilitates customer involvement in the web of firms. But there are challenges in achieving the 3rd stage. Some key business processes are still poorly understood and ill defined, despite the availability of technology. Furthermore there is a need for techniques to manage companies promoting workforce initiative and performance measures for self-directed, inter-enterprise project teams.

The method to operationalize virtual enterprise is different for each scale of company. Big corporations can reorganize business units and refocus on core competences to operate as a virtual enterprise. Small companies can collaborate to deliver quality, scope and scale collectively. SMEs can potentially exploit agile principles thru rapid partnership formation.

But this is easier said than done. There is still a lack of clarity on how to become agile, with insufficiently developed mindset, underdeveloped business practices, processes, methods and tools.

=== Capability for Reconfiguration ===
Agile enterprises need to be able shift focus, diversify and configure and re align their business to serve a particular purpose rapidly since windows of opportunities do not stay open for long. In order to do that they need to develop a strategic architecture that includes a corporate wide map of core skills. This will enable it to be swift by getting the market before competitors with new products and pro activity. For this operational reconfiguration is necessary to capitalize on the strategic architecture. Management must nurture operational flexibility at the plant level. But this should not be at the cost of excessive premium on technology. Managers should not consider new technology to provide a competitive advantages just because it is new.

=== Knowledge-driven Enterprise ===
Knowledge includes experiences of people in the organization, company reports, case histories, databases and other repositories In order for organizations to become agile, organizations, they need to focus on building knowledge bases and cultivating a well trained and motivated workforce. Such an organization is driven by knowledge and information available and possessed by the workforce. This epitomizes the notion that `knowledge is power'. "The ability to control the new product introduction process from the conceptualization and design stages through manufacturing to shipment and product support requires the exploitation of a knowledge-rich work force and sophisticated information technology in most industrial sectors"

== Relevance to lean manufacturing ==
This concept is closely related to lean manufacturing, in which the goal is to reduce waste as much as possible. In lean manufacturing, the company aims to cut all costs which are not directly related to the production of a product for the consumer. Agile manufacturing can include this concept, but it also adds an additional dimension, the idea that customer demands need to be met rapidly and effectively. In situations where companies integrate both approaches, they are sometimes said to be using "agile and lean manufacturing". Companies which utilize an agile manufacturing approach tend to have very strong networks with suppliers and related companies, along with numerous cooperative teams which work within the company to deliver products effectively. They can retool facilities quickly, negotiate new agreements with suppliers and other partners in response to changing market forces, and take other steps to meet customer demands. This means that the company can increase production on products with a high consumer demand, as well as redesign products to respond to issues which have emerged or will emerge in the open market.

== Importance of Agile Manufacturing ==
Markets can change very quickly, especially in the global economy. A company which cannot adapt quickly to change may find itself left behind, and once a company starts to lose market share, it can fall rapidly. The goal of agile manufacturing is to keep a company ahead of the competition so that consumers think of that company first, which allows it to continue innovating and introducing new products, because it is financially stable and it has a strong customer support base.

Companies that want to switch to the use of agile manufacturing can take advantage of consultants who specialize in helping companies convert and improve existing systems. Consultants can offer advice and assistance which is tailored to the industry a company is involved in, and they usually focus on making companies competitive as quickly as possible with proved agile techniques. There are also a number of textbooks and manuals available with additional information on agile manufacturing techniques and approaches.

=== Hybrid Lean-Agile Strategy ===
Another approach was developed combining the attributes of agility together with leanness across one supply chain is the hybrid lean-agile strategy. This blended lean-agile strategy hybridizes attributes of leanness (cost minimization, waste reduction, continuous improvement), agility (speed, flexibility, responsiveness) and leagility (mass customization, postponement) in one supply network. It is more efficient than the either lean or agile manufacturing processes alone. The significance of the hybridized lean aspect is higher upstream the supply chain than the agility dimension in the same supplier node, compared to downstream the supply chain at the distributor node closer to the customers, which operates in a more agile manner.

== See also ==
- Lean manufacturing
- Flexible manufacturing system
- Industrial engineering
