= Open Service Mesh =

Microsoft open source cloud native service mesh

Open Service Mesh (OSM)
- Original author: Microsoft
- Developer: Cloud Native Computing Foundation
- Initial release: 2020; 5 years ago
- Stable release: v1.2.4 / April 21, 2023; 2 years ago
- Repository: github.com/openservicemesh/osm
- Written in: Go
- Platform: Unix-like
- Type: Service mesh
- License: MIT License
- Website: openservicemesh.io

Open Service Mesh (OSM) was a free and open source cloud native service mesh developed by Microsoft that ran on Kubernetes.

== Overview ==
OSM was written in the Go programming language and designed to be a reference implementation of the Service Mesh Interface (SMI) specification, a standard interface for service meshes on Kubernetes. The software was based on the Envoy proxy server and allowed users to uniformly manage, secure, and get out-of-the-box observability features for highly dynamic microservice environments.

The source code is licensed under MIT License and available on GitHub. Microsoft donated OSM to the Cloud Native Computing Foundation to ensure that it is community-led and has open governance. On May 4, 2023, the project announced it would be archived, ending CNCF investment in the project so that its contributors could focus on Istio.

== See also ==
- Consul (software)
- Envoy (software)
- Helm (software)
- Linkerd
- Istio
