= Sidecar proxy =

App-side proxy in microservices

Sidecar proxy is a design pattern in software architecture that uses a proxy server next to an application, usually on the same host or in the same container, to handle network communication for the application. The proxy can balance loads, find services, encrypt data, and see what's going on without having to change the code of the application. It does this by intercepting incoming and outgoing traffic.

Sidecar proxies are frequently utilized in microservices and are a fundamental component of service mesh implementations, where each service instance is paired with a corresponding proxy instance. Examples of implementations include Envoy, which are often deployed in platforms such as Kubernetes to manage inter-service communications, apply security policies, and collect telemetry data.

== See also ==
- Service mesh
- Microservices
- Reverse proxy
- Kubernetes
- Envoy (software)
