= Polyfill =

Polyfill may refer to:

- Polyester fiberfill, also known as Poly-fil or polyfill, a synthetic fiber
- Polyfill (programming), in web development, code that implements a feature on web browsers that do not support the feature
- Polyfill.io, a JavaScript library created by Andrew Betts that implemented Polyfill.
- In graphics programming, the use of flood fill for filling polygons
- Polyfilla, a DIY spackling paste product
