= Object Modeling in Color =

Role	Moment, Interval
Description	Party, place, thing

UML color standards are a set of four colors associated with Unified Modeling Language (UML) diagrams. The coloring system indicates which of several archetypes apply to the UML object. UML typically identifies a stereotype with a bracketed comment for each object identifying whether it is a class, interface, etc.

These colors were first suggested by Peter Coad, Eric Lefebvre, and Jeff De Luca in a series of articles in The Coad Letter, and later published in their book Java Modeling In Color With UML.

Over hundreds of domain models, it became clear that four major "types" of classes appeared again and again, though they had different names in different domains. After much discussion, these were termed archetypes, which is meant to convey that the classes of a given archetype follow more or less the same form. That is, attributes, methods, associations, and interfaces are fairly similar among classes of a given archetype.

When attempting to classify a given domain class, one typically asks about the color standards in this order:

pink
moment-interval — Does it represent a moment or interval of time that we need to remember and work with for legal or business reasons? Examples in business systems generally model activities involving people, places and things such as a sale, an order, a rental, an employment, making a journey, etc.
yellow
roles — Is it a way of participating in an activity (by either a person, place, or thing)? A person playing the role of an employee in an employment, a thing playing the role of a product in a sale, a location playing the role of a classroom for a training course, are examples of roles.
blue
description — Is it simply a catalog-entry-like description which classifies or 'labels' an object? For example, the make and model of a car categorises or describes a number of physical vehicles. The relationship between the blue description and green party, place or thing is a type-instance relationship based on differences in the values of data items held in the 'type' object.
green
party, place, or thing — Something tangible, uniquely identifiable. Typically the role-players in a system. People are green. Organizations are green. The physical objects involved in a rental such as the physical DVDs are green things. Normally, if you get through the above three questions and end up here, your class is a "green."

Although the actual colors vary, most systems tend to use lighter color palettes so that black text can also be easily read on a colored background. Coad, et al., used the 4-color pastel Post-it notes, and later had UML modeling tools support the color scheme by associating a color to one or more class stereotypes.

Many people feel colored objects appeal to the pattern recognition section of the brain. Others advocate that you can begin a modeling process with a stack of four-color note cards or colored sticky notes.

The value of color modeling was especially obvious when standing back from a model drawn or projected on a wall. That extra dimension allowed modelers to see important aspects of the models (the pink classes, for instance), and to spot areas that may need reviewing (unusual combinations of color classes linked together).

The technique also made it easy to help determine aspects of the domain model – especially for newcomers to modeling. For example, by simply looking first for "pinks" in the domain, it was easy to begin to get some important classes identified for a given domain. It was also easy to review the standard types of attributes, methods, and so on, for applicability to the current domain effort.

== See also ==
- Upper ontology
- Object-oriented design
