= Magnus Choir =

Software synthesizer

Magnus Choir VST, VST3 and Audio Unit (Graphical User Interface)
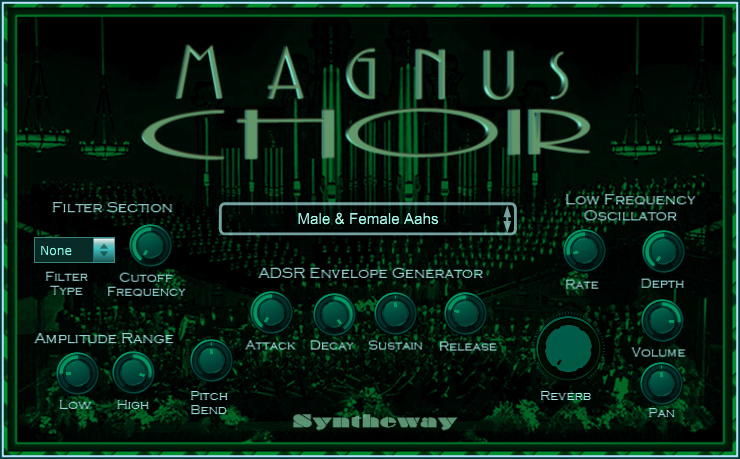
- Syntheway Magnus Choir Virtual Instrument Plugin
- Developer: Syntheway Virtual Musical Instruments
- Release: 2005
- Stable release: 2.5.0 (Windows) - 3.5.0 (Mac)
- Operating system: Windows, macOS
- Type: Software synthesizer
- License: Trialware
- Website: syntheway.net

Magnus Choir is a commercial, proprietary music software synthesizer, for the Microsoft Windows and macOS operating systems, written by Daniel Laiseca and developed by Syntheway Virtual Musical Instruments. The first version was released in 2005.

== Overview ==
This software can be used to create natural and synthetic choirs, vocal textures, choral pads and sustained vowels. It may work as a VST, VST3 or Audio Unit plugin within digital audio workstation software such as FL Studio, Cubase, Logic Pro or GarageBand. Magnus Choir also is compatible with FreeVST allowing Linux users to use native Microsoft Windows VST plugins by using parts of the Wine compatibility layer.

== Preset Sounds ==
Features 54 built-in preset sounds including a variety of choirs such as male and female mixed in classic SATB (Soprano, Alto, Tenor, Bass) structure: women sing Soprano and Alto, while men sing Tenor and Bass. Additionally includes choir pads, spatial voices, ambient, cinematic and soundscapes.

== Modulation Control ==
Magnus Choir includes modulation control with parameters which may be modulated such as Low-frequency oscillator, ADSR envelope generator, Filter and reverb effect emulation.

== See also ==
- MIDI
