= Consul (software) =

Service networking platform

- Developer: HashiCorp
- Release: April 17, 2014; 12 years ago
- Stable release: 2.1.0 / October 22, 2026; 10 days ago
- Written in: Go
- Operating system: Cross-platform
- Type: Distributed computing
- License: Mozilla Public License v2.0, BUSL-1.1
- Website: developer.hashicorp.com/consul
- Repository: github.com/hashicorp/consul

Consul is a service networking platform developed by HashiCorp.

Consul was initially released in 2014 as a service discovery platform. In addition to service discovery, it now provides a full-featured service mesh for secure service segmentation across any cloud or runtime environment, and distributed key–value storage for application configuration.

Registered services and nodes can be queried using a DNS interface or an HTTP interface. Envoy proxy provides security, observability, and resilience for all application traffic.

HashiCorp announced on August 10, 2023, that it changed the license of its software from the MPL license to the Business Source License 1.1.

== See also ==
- Envoy (software)
- Open Service Mesh
