= Micro frontend =

Pattern in front-end web development

A micro frontend is an architectural pattern for web development, where independently developed frontends are composed into a greater whole. It is analogous to a microservices approach but for client-side single-page applications written in JavaScript. It is a solution to de-composition and routing for multiple front-end applications.

Micro frontends (MFE) can be built using the following approaches:

- With tooling such as module federation or native federation
- With libraries such as Single-SPA or frameworks such as Piral
- With Web Components
- With iframes

Companies that use micro frontends are Canonical, IKEA, Scania AB, Spotify, etc.

For Webpack this concept is referred to as module federation.

== See also ==
- Microservices
- Software modernization
