= Cloud-native computing =

Approach in software development

Cloud native computing is an approach in software development that utilizes cloud computing to "build and run scalable applications in modern, dynamic environments such as public, private, and hybrid clouds". These technologies, such as containers, microservices, serverless functions, cloud native processors and immutable infrastructure, deployed via declarative code are common elements of this architectural style. Cloud native technologies focus on minimizing users' operational burden.

Cloud native techniques "enable loosely coupled systems that are resilient, manageable, and observable. Combined with robust automation, they allow engineers to make high-impact changes frequently and predictably with minimal toil." This independence contributes to the overall resilience of the system, as issues in one area do not necessarily cripple the entire application. Additionally, such systems are easier to manage, and monitor, given their modular nature, which simplifies tracking performance and identifying issues.

Frequently, cloud-native applications are built as a set of microservices that run in Open Container Initiative compliant containers, such as Containerd, and may be orchestrated in Kubernetes and managed and deployed using DevOps and Git CI workflows (although there is a large amount of competing open source that supports cloud-native development). The advantage of using containers is the ability to package all software needed to execute into one executable package. The container runs in a virtualized environment, which isolates the contained application from its environment.

== See also ==
- Cloud Native Computing Foundation
- Dapr
- Native cloud application
