= Polymer (library) =

Open-source JavaScript library of Web Components

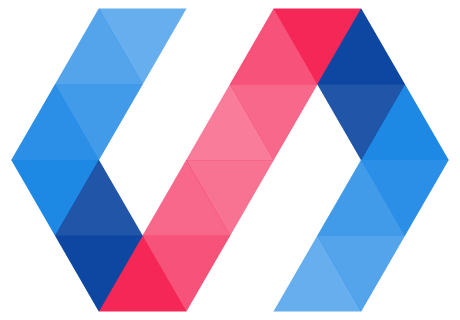
- Developers: Google and contributors
- Release: May 29, 2015; 11 years ago
Stable release
- 1.x: 1.12.0 / 21 May 2019; 7 years ago
- 2.x: 2.8.0 / 24 June 2019; 7 years ago
- 3.x: 3.5.2 / 7 October 2024; 2 years ago
- Written in: JavaScript, HTML
- Type: JavaScript library
- License: 3-Clause BSD
- Website: www.polymer-project.org
- Repository: polymer

Polymer is a discontinued open-source JavaScript library for building web applications using Web Components. Google and outside contributors developed it on GitHub. At Google I/O 2018 Google announced a successor base class, LitElement, and the Polymer documentation recommends it for new projects. Modern design principles are implemented as a separate project using Google's Material Design design principles.

Polymer is used by a number of Google services and websites, including YouTube, YouTube Gaming, the redesigned Google Earth (since 2017), Google I/O 2015 and 2016 websites, Google Play Music, redesign of Google Sites and Allo for web (until its shutdown in 2019).

Other notable users include Netflix, Electronics Arts, Comcast, Nuxeo, Coca-Cola, McDonald's, BBVA, IBM, Interxion and General Electric.

== History ==
Public development of Polymer began in November 2013 with the release of a Promises Polyfill. This steadily expanded into a web design library covering visual styling guidelines (via Material Design), data binding, and a large number of "Core" and "Paper" Web Components. Core components were originally envisioned to encompass generic functionality that would be essential to most websites, while Paper components were intended to provide more specialized components with Material Design concepts forming a key part of their design. A major milestone was reached with the release of Version 0.5, which was considered the first version of the project ready for use by early adopters.

Google continued to revise the design of Polymer after the release of 0.5, with special consideration given to the performance issues a number of developers found. This culminated with the release of Polymer 1.0 in 2015, which was the first "production ready" version of the library. Version 1.0 significantly improved the performance of Polymer, reducing load times by up to 7 times. With version 1.0 Google split the elements from the Polymer project to clearly distinguish the elements catalog from the Polymer polyfill & webcomponents-sugaring library.

On 14–15 September 2015, Google organized a Polymer Summit in Amsterdam.

On 17–18 October 2016, Google organized a Polymer Summit in London.

On 22–23 August 2017, Google organized a Polymer Summit in Copenhagen.

On 2 May 2018, the Polymer team announced that any future development in Polymer will shift away from its two-way binding and its template system, and will focus on LitElement (still part of Polymer) and one-way bindings.

== Features ==
Polymer provides a number of features over vanilla Web Components:

- Simplified way of creating custom elements
- Both One-way and Two-way data binding
- Computed properties
- Conditional and repeat templates
- Gesture events

== Usage ==
Polymer has begun to gain increasing recognition in the market, with spikes in use in 2015 and 2016 as documented by the website BuiltWith. Special attention has been paid to its structured design process, allowing for an interoperable "Lego Block" structure. LitElement was developed by the Google Chrome team as part of the Polymer project in 2018. LitElement was designed to be a lightweight and easy-to-use framework for creating web components that can be used with any front-end framework or library.

== Custom elements ==
Custom elements can be created using ES (ECMAScript, most commonly JavaScript) modules with classes. Custom element definition comprises CSS style, HTML template of the element's local DOM, element properties, lifecycle callbacks and JavaScript methods:

import { PolymerElement, html } from '@polymer/polymer';

class HelloElement extends PolymerElement {
    // Define the element's template
    static get template() { 
        return html`
            <style>
                /* Local DOM CSS style */
            </style>
            <!-- Local DOM -->
            Hello {{name}}!
        `; 
    }

    static get is() {
        return 'hello-element';
    }

    // Define public API properties
    static get properties() {
        return {
            name: {
                type: String
            }
        };
    }
}

window.customElements.define(HelloElement.is, HelloElement);

The element defined above can be used in HTML code:

<hello-element name="World"></hello-element>

== See also ==
- Svelte
- JavaScript framework
- Comparison of JavaScript-based web frameworks
- Web Components
