= Cockburn Scale =

The Cockburn Scale, also known as the Project Classification Scale, is a method of describing how much formal process a software project requires. The scale was described in Alistair Cockburn's book Agile Software Development. According to the author, the scale can be applied to other types of project, not only those that employ Agile methodologies.

== Definition ==
The Cockburn Scale categorizes projects according to "criticality" and "size".

Process criticality is defined as the worst probable effect of an unremedied defect:

- Loss of Life (L)
- Loss of Essential Money (E)
- Loss of Discretionary Money (D)
- Loss of Comfort (C)

Process size is defined as the size of the project's development staff. It is an open-ended scale, but the most commonly used values are 6, 20, 40, 100, and 200.

A project is described by a pair of criticality and size indicators: for example, a two-person, life-critical project is categorized as a L6, while a 50-person project that, if it fails, could jeopardize the profits of an organization but not the organization's continued existence is categorized as a D100.

== Application of the Scale ==
The criticality and size of a project can be juxtaposed on a grid:

L	L6	L20	L40	L100
E	E6	E20	E40	E100
D	D6	D20	D40	D100
C	C6	C20	C40	C100
	1-6	7-20	21-40	41-100

Project classes closer to the top right corner of the table require a more formal process than project classes closer to the bottom left corner.
