= Alistair Cockburn =

American computer programmer

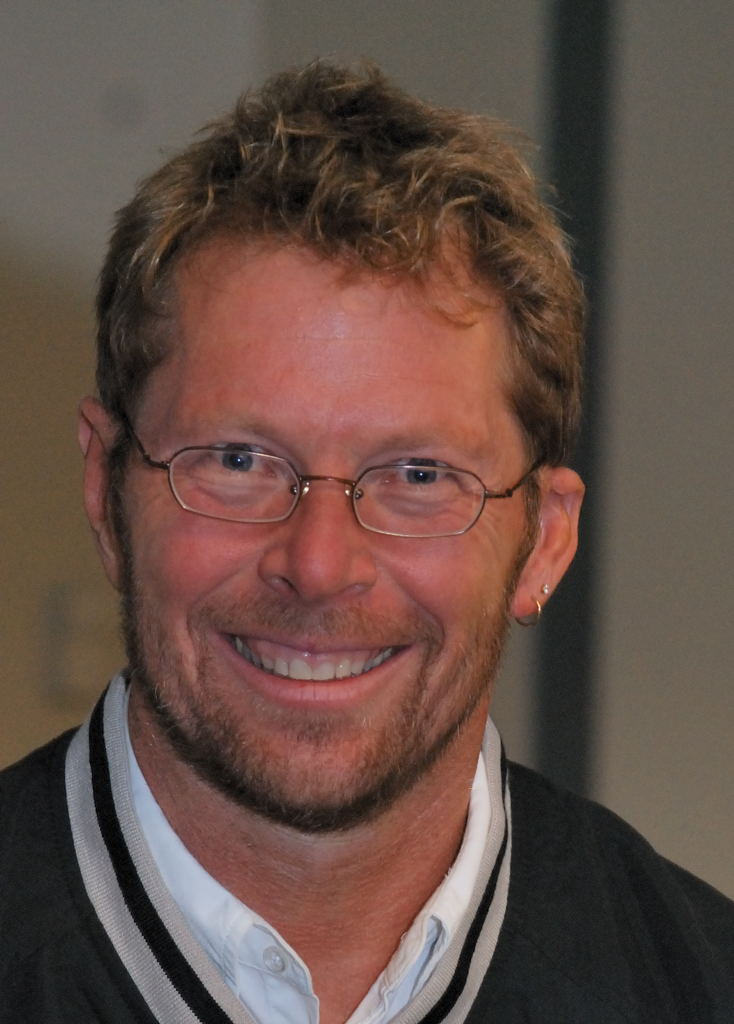
- Alistair Cockburn in 2007
- Occupation: Computer programmer

Alistair Cockburn (/ˈælɪstər ˈkoʊbərn/ AL-ist-ər KOH-bərn) is an American computer scientist, known as one of the initiators of the agile movement in software development. He cosigned (with 16 others) the Manifesto for Agile Software Development.

== Life and career ==
Cockburn started studying the methods of object oriented (OO) software development for IBM. From 1994, he formed "Humans and Technology" in Salt Lake City. He obtained his degree in computer science at the Case Western Reserve University. In 2003, he received his PhD degree from the University of Oslo. His thesis was entitled "People and Methodologies in Software Development"

Cockburn helped write the Manifesto for Agile Software Development in 2001, the agile PM Declaration of Interdependence in 2005, and co-founded the International Consortium for Agile in 2009 (with Ahmed Sidky and Ash Rofail). He is a principal expositor of the use case for documenting business processes and behavioral requirements for software, and inventor of the Cockburn Scale for categorizing software projects.

The methodologies in the Crystal family (e.g., Crystal Clear), described by Alistair Cockburn, are considered examples of lightweight methodology. The Crystal family is colour-coded to signify the "weight" of methodology needed. Thus, a large project which has consequences that involve risk to human life would use the Crystal Sapphire or Crystal Diamond methods. A small project might use Crystal Clear, Crystal Yellow or Crystal Orange.

Cockburn presented his Hexagonal Architecture (2005) as a solution to problems with traditional layering, coupling and entanglement.

In 2015, Alistair launched the Heart of Agile movement which is presented as a response to the overly complex state of the Agile industry.

== Selected publications ==
- Surviving Object-Oriented Projects, Alistair Cockburn, 1st edition, December, 1997, Addison-Wesley Professional, ISBN 0-201-49834-0.
- Writing Effective Use Cases, Alistair Cockburn, 1st edition, January, 2000, Addison-Wesley Professional, ISBN 0-201-70225-8.
- Agile Software Development, Alistair Cockburn, 1st edition, December 2001, Addison-Wesley Professional, ISBN 0-201-69969-9.
- Patterns for Effective Use Cases, Steve Adolph, Paul Bramble, with Alistair Cockburn, Andy Pols contributors, August 2002, Addison-Wesley Professional, ISBN 0-201-72184-8.
- People and Methodologies in Software Development, Alistair Cockburn, February 2003, D.Ph. dissertation, University of Oslo Press
- Crystal Clear : A Human-Powered Methodology for Small Teams, Alistair Cockburn, October 2004, Addison-Wesley Professional, ISBN 0-201-69947-8.
- Agile Software Development: The Cooperative Game, Alistair Cockburn, 2nd edition, October 2006, Addison-Wesley Professional, ISBN 0-321-48275-1, ISBN 978-0-321-48275-4 .
