= Jeff De Luca =

Australian information technology strategist

Jeff De Luca is a global information technology strategist and an author in the field of software development methodology. He is considered the primary architect of Feature Driven Development (FDD) circa 1999 [^JDLBIO], a lightweight methodology for developing computer software with reduced management overhead, time and money.

In 1999, Jeff De Luca co-authored Java Modeling In Color With UML (1999, ISBN 0-13-011510-X), along with Peter Coad and Eric Lefebvre.

Jeff De Luca was born in 1964. Although Jeff dropped out of secondary school (high school), and did not start with a college degree, he learned, on-the-job, working for years with programmers and designers at IBM in Melbourne, Australia and transferred with IBM to the United States in Raleigh, North Carolina (^JDLBIO). At the IBM Rochester Minnesota Programming Laboratory, Jeff developed network software to connect different types of IBM computer systems, and continued learning at IBM for those 11 years. He had begun in the mailroom: in 1981, aged 17, he had left school and started working at IBM, Melbourne, as the mailroom clerk.

Jeff resigned from IBM in 1993, as a senior systems strategist. After IBM, Jeff formed his own consultancy company, Nebulon Pty Ltd, based in Melbourne, Australia, and developed extensive, complex software systems using the Java technology (with the programming language), object-modelling in UML, and FDD.
