= Helm (package manager) =

Software package manager

- Developer: Cloud Native Computing Foundation
- Stable release: v4.3.1 / October 15, 2026; 17 days ago
- Written in: Go
- Operating system: macOS, Linux, Windows
- Platform: i386, amd64, arm, arm64, ppc64le, riscv64, s390x
- Type: Package manager
- License: Apache License 2.0
- Website: helm.sh
- Repository: github.com/helm/helm

Helm is a package manager for Kubernetes. It uses "charts" as its package format, which is based on YAML. It provides support for defining templates using Go template syntax to generate Kubernetes resource manifests dynamically.

== History ==
Helm began in 2015 as "Helm Classic", a project started at a hackathon hosted by Deis and introduced at the inaugural KubeCon. In January 2016, Helm Classic merged with Google's Kubernetes Deployment Manager tool and moved under the Kubernetes project. Helm 2.0.0 was released on November 17, 2016, introducing a server-side component named Tiller.

Helm was accepted into the Cloud Native Computing Foundation on June 1, 2018 at the Incubating maturity level. Helm 3.0.0 was released on November 13, 2019, removing Tiller so that Helm communicates directly with the Kubernetes API server. Helm then moved to the Graduated maturity level on May 1, 2020. On October 7, 2020, the Helm Hub chart-discovery service was retired in favor of CNCF's Artifact Hub.

Helm v4.0.0 was released on November 12, 2025 at KubeCon + CloudNativeCon North America, the first major version update in six years, coinciding with the project's tenth anniversary.
