= Peter Coad =

American computer scientist

Peter Coad (born December 30, 1953) is a software entrepreneur and author of books on software architecture and design. He is notable for his role in defining what have come to be known as the UML colors, a color-coded notation chiefly useful for adding breadth and depth to a design, using four major archetypes.

Later in his career, he turned his attention to nonprofit work and developed software to help people read and study the Scriptures more effectively. This resulted in Parallel Plus® Bible-study app.

== Biography ==
Coad received a Bachelor of Science with Honors in Electrical Engineering from OSU (Stillwater) in 1977 and a Master of Science in Computer Science from USC in 1981.

From 1978 to 1988, Coad worked as a systems engineer and a software-methods coach.

In 1988, Peter Coad founded Object International, a software consulting firm where he served as president.

From 1989 to 1999, Coad coached teams on how to build systems that would gracefully accommodate unexpected change. He authored six books on object-oriented development, beginning with "Object-Oriented Analysis" in 1989.

In 1999, Coad was co-founder of the software company TogetherSoft, where he served as chairman, chief executive officer, and president. The company was known for a successful CASE/UML tool Together which was later sold to Borland.

From 1999 to 2003, Coad built and led 350-person team in a successful software startup, TogetherSoft. Coad received 11 US patents (link https://uspto.report/company/Coad-Peter).

From about 2000 to 2004 Coad was editor-in-chief of the Coad Series of books from Prentice Hall. This series of books were in the field of software development.

Coad became senior vice president and chief strategist of Borland Software Corp. when Borland bought TogetherSoft in January 2003. Coad left Borland before the end of 2003 and turned his attention to interests outside of the software development field, especially simplified teaching techniques for learning to read The Bible in its original languages.

Since 2004, Peter Coad leads a small team, inventing and developing the "Parallel Plus® Bible-study app." Coad and team focus on user experiences that encourage best study practices.

Coad and his spouse, Judy, have been married since 1978.

In 2022, Peter Coad started a new project dedicated to a night-sky photography.

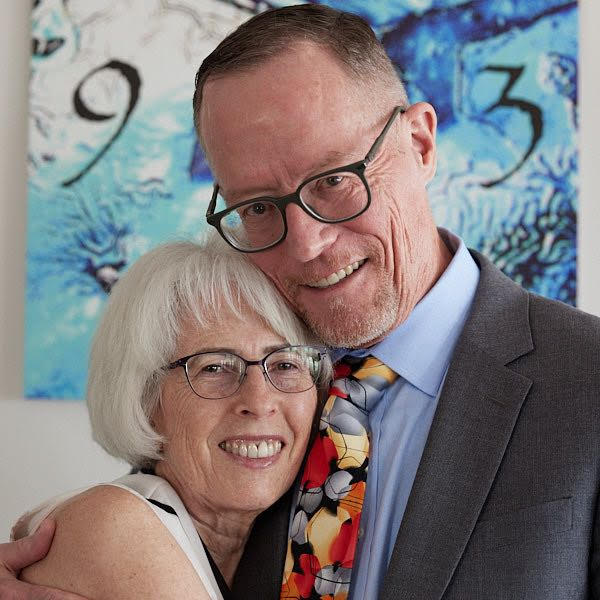
Judy and Peter Coad

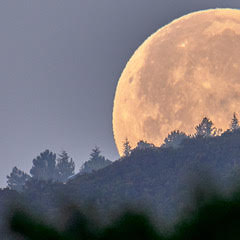
©2022 Night contrast Moon by Peter Coad

== Publications ==
Books

- Java Modeling In Color With UML, Peter Coad, Eric Lefebvre, and Jeff De Luca, June 1999, ISBN 0-13-011510-X
- Java Design: Building Better Apps and Applets (2nd Edition), Peter Coad, Mark Mayfield, and Jon Kern, 1998, ISBN 0-13-911181-6
- Object Models: Strategies, Patterns, and Applications, (2nd Edition) Peter Coad, Mark Mayfield, and David North, 1996, ISBN 0-13-840117-9
- Object-Oriented Programming, Peter Coad and Jill Nicola, 1993, pages 582, ISBN 0-13-032616-X
- Object Oriented Design, Peter Coad and Ed Yourdon, 1991, ISBN 0-13-630070-7
- Object Oriented Analysis (1st Edition), Peter Coad and Edward Yourdon, 1990, ISBN 0136291228
- Object Oriented Analysis (2nd Edition), Peter Coad and Ed Yourdon, 1990, pages 233, ISBN 0-13-629981-4

Selected Papers

- Amplified Learning pdf A practical guide to applying the "seven intelligences" theory, so that your presentations can be more engaging, effective, and fun.
